= List of storms named Esang =

The name Esang has been used for two tropical cyclones in the Western Pacific Ocean, both named by PAGASA:

- Typhoon Viola (1978) (T7829, 33W, Esang) – a strong, late-season typhoon which recurved at sea.
- Typhoon Zelda (1994) (T9434, 37W, Esang) – another intense typhoon that remained at sea.

== See also ==
Similar names that have been used for tropical cyclones:

- List of storms named Elang – also used in the Western Pacific Ocean.
- List of storms named Emang – used in the Western Pacific Ocean and in the South-West Indian Ocean.
- Typhoon Enang (1964) – internationally known as Typhoon Dot.
- List of storms named Isang – used in the Western Pacific Ocean and in the South-West Indian Ocean.
- List of storms named Osang – also used in the Western Pacific Ocean.
