= List of storms named Elang =

The name Elang has been used to name nine tropical cyclones within the Philippine Area of Responsibility in the West Pacific Ocean. All storms were named by the PAGASA (Philippine Atmospheric, Geophysical and Astronomical Services Administration) or its predecessor, the Philippine Weather Bureau:

- Typhoon Amy (1965) (T6507, 07W, Elang) – impacted the Philippines and Japan.
- Typhoon Viola (1969) (T6905, 05W, Elang) – an extremely deadly Category 4-equivalent super typhoon that caused around 10,000 deaths when it made landfall in China.
- Tropical Storm Joan (1973) (T7311, 12W, Elang) – struck southern China and Vietnam as a tropical depression.
- Typhoon Sarah (1977) (T7703, 05W, Elang) – made landfall in the Philippines, Hainan, and Vietnam.
- Tropical Storm Lynn (1981) (T8107, 05W, Elang) – caused 28 deaths along its path.
- Tropical Depression Elang (1985) – considered a tropical storm by the PAGASA.
- Tropical Storm Faye (1989) (T8907, 07W, Elang) – struck the Philippines, Hainan, and Vietnam.
- Tropical Depression 07W (1993) (07W, Elang) – crossed the Philippines.
- Typhoon Rosie (1997) (T9709, 10W, Elang) – a Category 5-equivalent super typhoon that made landfall in Japan as a Category 1-equivalent typhoon, killing 5 people.

After the 2000 Pacific typhoon season, the PAGASA revised their naming lists. The name Elang was excluded from the new lists.

== See also ==
Similar names that have been used for tropical cyclones:

- List of storms named Delang – also used in the Western Pacific Ocean.
- List of storms named Emang – used in the Western Pacific Ocean and in the South-West Indian Ocean.
- Typhoon Enang (1964) – internationally known as Typhoon Dot.
- List of storms named Esang – also used in the Western Pacific Ocean.
