= List of storms named Emang =

The name Emang has been used for ten tropical cyclones worldwide: nine in the Western Pacific Ocean and one in the South-West Indian Ocean. All of the Western Pacific cyclones were named by either the Philippine Weather Bureau or its successor PAGASA, and the South-West Indian Ocean cyclone was named by Météo-France.

In the Western Pacific Ocean:

- Typhoon Kit (1966) (T6604, 04W, Emang) – a strong early-season typhoon which hit Japan, resulting in 64 deaths.
- Tropical Storm Ruby (1970) (T7004, 04W, Emang) – a severe tropical storm that made landfall in the Philippines and China before becoming extratropical.
- Tropical Depression Emang (1974) – a system that was only recognized by PAGASA.
- Typhoon Wendy (1978) (T7808, 08W, Emang) – a relatively strong typhoon which hit Japan.
- Tropical Storm Winona (1982) (T8208, 09W, Emang) – a severe tropical storm that crossed the Philippines and China, causing minor damage.
- Tropical Storm Owen (1986) (T8606, 06W, Emang) – a short-lived tropical storm which remained at sea during its lifespan.
- Tropical Storm Tasha (1990) (T9009, 10W, Emang) – a damaging severe tropical storm which brought major flooding to China, killing at least 108 people.
- Tropical Storm Russ (1994) (T9403, 05W, Emang) – another destructive severe tropical storm that devastated China, claiming at least 74 lives.
- Typhoon Todd (1998) (T9806, 10W, Emang) – a strong but short-lived typhoon which affected Japan, causing 6 fatalities.

In the South-West Indian Ocean:

- Tropical Storm Emang (2013) – a moderate tropical storm that did not affect land.

== See also ==
Similar names that have been used for tropical cyclones:

- List of storms named Amang – also used in the Western Pacific Ocean.
- List of storms named Elang – also used in the Western Pacific Ocean.
- List of storms named Emong – also used in the Western Pacific Ocean.
- Typhoon Enang (1964) – internationally known as Typhoon Dot.
- List of storms named Esang – also used in the Western Pacific Ocean.
