= Typhoon Irma (1985) =

Pacific typhoon in 1985

Typhoon Irma (Daling)
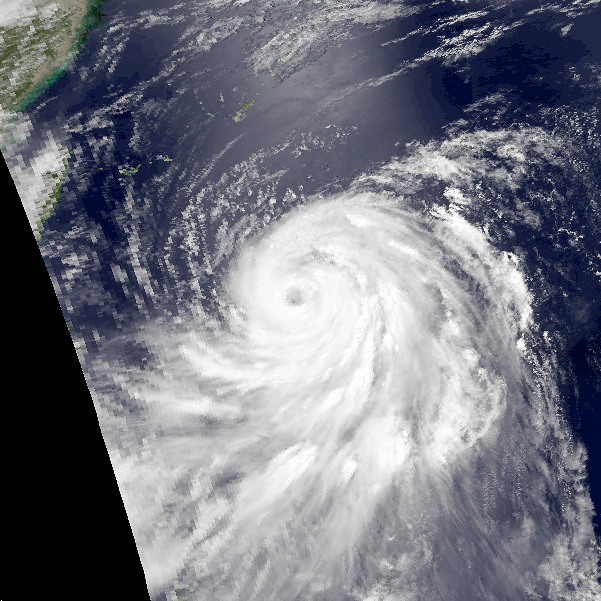
- Typhoon Irma on June 28

Meteorological history
- Formed: June 23, 1985
- Extratropical: July 1, 1985
- Dissipated: July 7, 1985

Typhoon
- 10-minute sustained (JMA)
- Highest winds: 150 km/h (90 mph)
- Lowest pressure: 960 hPa (mbar); 28.35 inHg

Category 2-equivalent typhoon
- 1-minute sustained (SSHWS/JTWC)
- Highest winds: 165 km/h (105 mph)
- Lowest pressure: 957 hPa (mbar); 28.26 inHg

Overall effects
- Fatalities: 81
- Damage: $561 million (1985 USD)
- Areas affected: Philippines, Japan
- IBTrACS
- Part of the 1985 Pacific typhoon season

Typhoon Irma, known in the Philippines as Typhoon Daling, affected the Philippines in late June 1985. Typhoon Irma originated from a monsoon trough situated near Guam in the Western Pacific Ocean. It slowly developed, with insufficient organization delaying classification as a tropical cyclone. By June 24, organization improved as the system encountered favorable conditions aloft and the disturbance attained tropical storm intensity the next day. Moving west, Irma gradually deepened, and on June 28, it was believed to have attained typhoon intensity. On the morning of June 27, Irma was upgraded into a typhoon. After passing northeast of the Philippines, Typhoon Irma attained its peak intensity on June 29. Accelerating to the north and then the northeast, Irma steadily weakened as it encountered significantly less favorable conditions. The typhoon made landfall in central Japan on June 30. Irma weakened below typhoon intensity the next day, and later on July 1, Irma transition into an extratropical cyclone. The remnants of the cyclone were tracked until July 7, when it merged with an extratropical low south of the Kamchatka Peninsula.

Although Irma stayed offshore the Philippines, moisture associated with the storm inundated areas already affected by Typhoon Hal earlier in the week. The capital city of Manila was 60% flooded, resulting in the evacuation of 40,000. Six drownings were reported in the nearby suburb of Quezon City, where 1,000 families were evacuated. Citywide, eight people were killed. In Olongapo City, seven people were buried because of a landslide. Overall, more than 500,000 people were directly affected by the typhoon throughout the country. A total of 253 homes were destroyed, with 1,854 others partially damaged. Nationwide, 65 people were killed due to the typhoon and damage totaled $16 million (1985 USD).

Across Japan, Irma brought widespread flooded that resulted in 1,475 mudslides, which damaged 625 residencies. The storm left 650,000 customers without power. In the Chiba Prefecture, seven people were injured. In the capital city of Tokyo, 119 trees were toppled, 40 homes were flooded, 20 flights were cancelled, 26 railway lines were suspended, and 25 roads were flooded, all combining to leave more than 240,000 stranded. In Izu Ōshima, 17 boats were swept away and 20 houses were damaged. Nationwide, 19 people were killed and 49 others were injured. A total of 811 dwellings were destroyed and 10,000 others were damage. Throughout the country, the storm inflicted $545 million in damage.

== Meteorological history ==
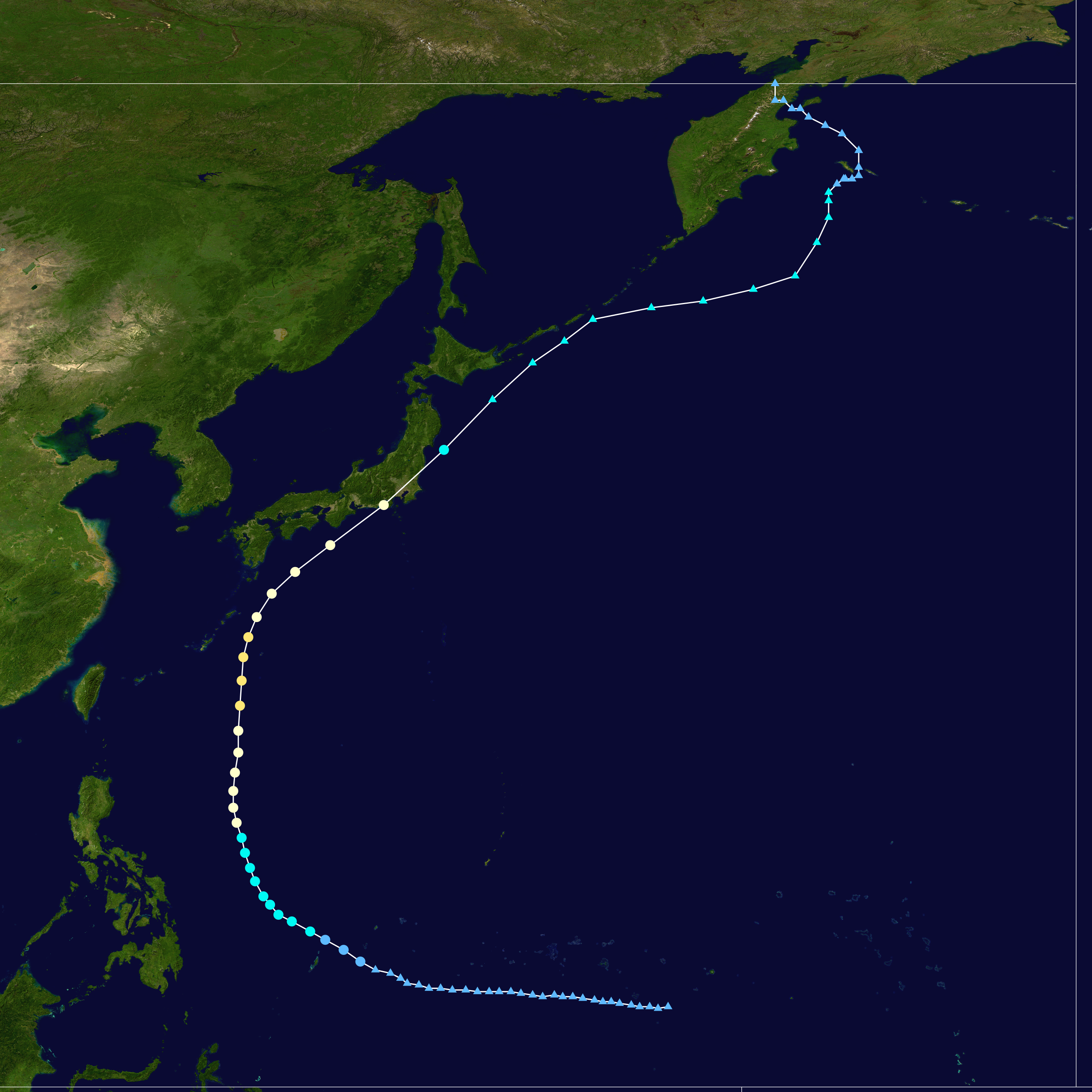
Map plotting the storm's track and intensity, according to the Saffir–Simpson scale Map key Saffir–Simpson scale Tropical depression (≤38 mph, ≤62 km/h) Tropical storm (39–73 mph, 63–118 km/h) Category 1 (74–95 mph, 119–153 km/h) Category 2 (96–110 mph, 154–177 km/h) Category 3 (111–129 mph, 178–208 km/h) Category 4 (130–156 mph, 209–251 km/h) Category 5 (≥157 mph, ≥252 km/h) Unknown Storm type Tropical cyclone Subtropical cyclone Extratropical cyclone, remnant low, tropical disturbance, or monsoon depression

During mid-June 1985, the monsoon trough in the Western Pacific retreated eastward to near Guam, spawning several areas of low pressure. At 00:00 UTC on June 17, a tropical disturbance embedded within the monsoon trough was detected by meteorologists on weather satellite imagery about 400 km (250 mi) southwest of the island of Ponape. Although the disturbance's surface circulation was initially ill-defined, interaction with an upper-level low (ULL) to the southeast of Guam associated with a broader tropical upper-tropospheric trough (TUTT) enhanced development and thus the low was slow to develop. Moving west-northwest south of a ridge, the disturbance passed 180 km (110 mi) south-southeast of the Truk Atoll early on June 18. Following an increase of thunderstorm activity associated with the disturbance in both coverage and organization, the JTWC issued a Tropical Cyclone Formation Alert (TCFA) for the system at noon the same day.

During the next three days, the disturbance maintained vigorous, but poorly organized convection. Data from a Hurricane Hunter aircraft on June 19 failed to locate a surface circulation. That afternoon, the TCFA was re-issued. On the afternoon of June 20, the Hurricane Hunters finally founded a closed circulation, but outflow from nearby Typhoon Hal inhibited further development. Early on June 22, the TCFA was cancelled because of a decrease in thunderstorm activity. By June 24, however, vertical wind shear had begun to relax, coinciding with an expansion of the storm's southwesterly outflow channel. Several hours later, the Japan Meteorological Agency (JMA) started tracking the cyclone. (Note: The Japan Meteorological Agency is the official Regional Specialized Meteorological Center for the western Pacific Ocean.) After an increase in thunderstorm activity, the TCFA was re-issued for the fifth and final time on the evening of June 24. Based on a rapid improvement in the system's convective structure and Dvorak classifications of tropical storm intensity, the JTWC upgraded the system to Tropical storm Irma early on June 25. Shortly thereafter, a Hurricane Hunter aircraft measured winds of 80 km/h (50 mph) and a minimum barometric pressure of 994 mbar (29.4 inHg), though these winds were displaced roughly 150 km (95 mi) to the west of the center. Based on this, the JMA followed suit and declared the system a tropical cyclone at 06:00 UTC on June 25. At around the same time, the Philippine Atmospheric, Geophysical and Astronomical Services Administration (PAGASA) started to follow the storm and assigned it with the local name Daling. At midday on June 25, the JMA upgraded Irma to severe tropical storm intensity

Initially, the JTWC predicted Irma to follow Hal along the monsoon trough into the South China Sea before curving around a subtropical ridge. Irma slowly deepened, and according to the JMA, the system attained a secondary peak intensity of 115 km/h (70 mph) late on June 25. (Note: Wind estimates from the JMA and most other basins throughout the world are sustained over 10 minutes, while estimates from the United States-based Joint Typhoon Warning Center are sustained over 1 minute. 10 minute winds are about 1.14 times the amount of 1 minute winds.) However, by June 26, the JTWC revised its forecast and instead expected the storm to take a more northerly trek. On June 27, Irma's forward speed slowed as it approached the edge of the subtropical ridge situated along the 130th meridian east while intensifying. That morning, both the JTWC and the JMA estimated that Irma attained typhoon intensity; this upgraded was primarily based on data from ship reports. Continuing to intensify, Irma moved northward. However, by June 28, the JMA indicated that Irma leveled off in intensity. At 00:00 UTC on June 29, the JTWC estimated a peak intensity of 170 km/h (105 mph). Six hours later, the JMA increased the intensity of the typhoon to 145 km/h (90 mph), its maximum intensity. At this time, the agency also assessed the pressure of the storm at 960 mbar (28 inHg).

Shortly after its peak, Typhoon Irma began to accelerate towards the northeast in the direction of central Japan in response to westerlies. Irma quickly weakened, and on the evening of June 29, the JMA decreased the intensity of Irma to 120 km/h (75 mph). Tracking just east of the Ryukyu Islands, Irma began to acquire extratropical characteristics A Hurricane Hunter flight on June 30 suggested that that typhoon was encountering cooler and drier air, although the storm maintained a 55 km (35 mi) eye. That evening, the typhoon made landfall on Honshu. At 00:00 UTC on July 1, the JMA downgraded Irma into a severe tropical storm. Six hours later, the cyclone completed its extratropical transition near Tokyo; the JTWC issued its final warning on the system. The JMA continued the monitor the system as it passed northeast of the Kuril Islands. On July 7, the JMA ceased tracking the system as it had merged with an extratropical low south of the Kamchatka Peninsula.

== Preparations and impact ==
Prior to the arrival of Irma, storm signals were issued for much of Luzon, including Samar and Catanduanes. Although the system remained offshore Taiwan, it came close enough to require storm signals.

Even though Typhoon Irma passed well east to the Philippines, over 30 in (710 mm) of rain fell over parts of Luzon. These rains resulted in major flooding; Irma was also the second storm to directly affect the nation within a week, following Typhoon Hal. The capital city of Manila sustained flooding along low-lying areas, which stranded motorists. A total of 60% of the city was flooded, forcing the evacuation of 40,000 persons. Six drownings occurred in the suburb of Quezon City, where 1,000 families were evacuated, 700 to churches and 300 to schools. Within the Manila metropolitan area, a man and a woman were also electrocuted. All classes in Manila were suspended, and many stores and offices shut down for a day. Furthermore, domestic flights in and out of Manila were canceled since the runway was flooded with water 600 mm (25 in) deep. Citywide, eight people were killed. According to press reports, Irma was to worst tropical cyclone to directly impact Manila in over 10 years.

Offshore Bataan, eight fishermen were initially rendered missing after a boat capsized. In Olongapo City, seven people were buried due to a landslide. In the downtown Santa Cruz area, all forms of transportation except for the railroad were immobile. The Makati area sustained waist-deep flooding. Due to both Irma and Hal, 14 communities in Tarlac were flooded, leaving 375,000 people displaced, 116,963 of whom were evacuated to 46 evacuation centers. Seven bridges were also damaged. Overall, 511,067 people, or 94,661 families were directly affected by the typhoon. A total of 253 homes were destroyed, with 1,854 others partially damaged. Nationwide, 65 people were killed due to the typhoon. The storm inflicted $13.7 million in damage to infrastructure and $2.3 million in damage to agriculture, totaling to approximately $16 million. (Note: All currencies are converted from Philippines Pesos to United States Dollars using this with an exchange rate of the year 1985.)

Upon making landfall on Honshu, Irma became the first tropical system to strike the nation that season. Impacting an area already devastated by prior flooding, Irma deluged the archipelago with additional precipitation. Mount Ontake received 718 mm (30 in) of rain throughout the duration of the storm. Additionally, Mount Amagi recorded 18.0 in (457 mm) in a day, including 64 mm (2.5 in) in an hour, both storm highs in those respective categories. A total of 1,475 mudslides occurred in Japan, resulting in 625 damaged homes. Approximately 650,000 customers were left without power at the height of the storm while 160 trains were delayed or cancelled, which left 50,000 people stranded. In Chiba Prefecture, one person was listed missing due to a drowning, where seven persons were also hurt and over 200 houses were flooded. There, 400,000 individuals were also stranded due to lack of train service. In Tokyo, 119 trees were toppled and 25 roads were flooded. Twenty domestic airline flights were cancelled and 26 railway lines within Tokyo were suspended, leaving 240,000 people stranded. Throughout the city, at least 40 dwellings sustained flooding. In Izu Ōshima, 17 boats were swept away and 20 houses were damaged. Offshore, 26 individuals were rescued from a 5,100 tonnes (5,100,000 kg) freighter Gloria Fortuna. Throughout the country, 493 people sought refuge in shelters. In all, 19 people were killed and 49 others were injured. A total of 811 dwellings were destroyed and 10,000 homes were damaged, with 12,691 houses flooded. Nationwide, a total of 31,617 ha (78,125 acres) of crops were damaged. Across Japan, damage amounted to $545 million, (Note: All currencies are converted from Japanese yen to United States Dollars using this with an exchange rate of the year 1985.) including at least $61 million in property damage.

== See also ==
- Other tropical cyclones named Irma
- Other tropical cyclones named Daling
- Typhoon Dot (1985) – affected the Philippines later that year
