= List of storms named Emong =

The name Emong has been used for seven tropical cyclones in the Philippine Area of Responsibility by PAGASA in the Western Pacific Ocean.

- Typhoon Chebi (2001) (T0102, 04W, Emong) – approached Taiwan and struck China.
- Tropical Depression Emong (2005) – a tropical depression that was only recognized by the Japan Meteorological Agency (JMA) and PAGASA.
- Typhoon Chan-hom (2009) (T0902, 02W, Emong) – a Category 2-equivalent typhoon made landfall in Luzon.
- Tropical Storm Leepi (2013) (T1304, 04W, Emong) – approached Japan.
- Severe Tropical Storm Nanmadol (2017) (T1703, 05W, Emong) – did not affect the Philippines but did impact Japan.
- Tropical Depression Emong (2021) (07W, Emong) – affected the Philippines.
- Severe Tropical Storm Co-May (2025) (T2508, 11W, Emong) – one of the strongest typhoons to make landfall in Pangasinan since 2009.

The name Emong was retired following the 2025 Pacific typhoon season and was replaced by Elias for the 2029 season, which refers to one of the main characters in Jose Rizal's novel Noli Me Tángere.

== See also ==
- List of storms named Emang – a similar name that has been used in the Western Pacific Ocean and in the South-West Indian Ocean.
