= List of storms named Atang =

The name Atang has been used to name five tropical cyclones worldwide: four in the Western Pacific Ocean's Philippine Area of Responsibility (all named by the Philippine Weather Bureau or its successor PAGASA) and one in the South-West Indian Ocean (named by Météo-France).

In the Western Pacific:

- Typhoon Hester (1966) (T6601, 01W, Atang)
- Typhoon Nancy (1970) (T7001, 01W, Atang)
- Tropical Storm Wanda (1974) (T7401, 01W, Atang)
- Typhoon Olive (1978) (T7802, 02W, Atang)

The name Atang was retired from use by PAGASA after the 1978 season, and the name was replaced by Akang for subsequent seasons.

In the South-West Indian Ocean:

- Tropical Depression Atang (2002) – produced rainfall in Mozambique and Tanzania

== See also ==
Similar names that have been used for tropical cyclones:

- List of storms named Akang – replaced Atang in the Western Pacific Ocean
- List of storms named Amang – also used in the Western Pacific Ocean
