= List of storms named Irma =

The name Irma has been used for two tropical cyclones in the Atlantic Ocean, one in the Australian region, one in the South-West Indian Ocean, and fifteen in the Western Pacific Ocean.

In the Atlantic Ocean:

- Tropical Storm Irma (1978), formed near the Azores and remained at sea.
- Hurricane Irma (2017), a powerful Category 5 hurricane that affected the Caribbean, Cuba, The Bahamas, and the Southeastern United States, causing casualties and extensive damage along its path.

The name Irma was retired after the 2017 season from future use in the Atlantic, and was replaced with Idalia for the 2023 season.

In the Australian region:

- Cyclone Irma (1987), formed in the Gulf of Carpentaria.

In the South-West Indian Ocean:

- Cyclone Irma (1967)

In the Western Pacific Ocean:

- Tropical Storm Irma (1949) (T4907)
- Typhoon Irma (1953) (T5301)
- Typhoon Irma (1957) (T5717), which struck Vietnam
- Tropical Storm Irma (1960) (38W, a tropical depression)
- Tropical Storm Irma (1963) (T6316, 32W)
- Typhoon Irma (1966) (T6602, 02W, Klaring), struck the Philippines and killed 82 people
- Typhoon Irma (1968) (T6821, 26W)
- Typhoon Irma (1971) (T7135, 37W, Ining)
- Typhoon Irma (1974) (T7430, 34W, Bidang) – struck the Philippines
- Typhoon Irma (1978) (T7818, 19W), approached Taiwan and struck Japan
- Typhoon Irma (1981) (T8126, 26W, Anding), also called Super Typhoon Irma, which struck the Philippines and killed 409 people
- Typhoon Irma (1985) (T8506, 06W, Daling) – struck Japan
- Tropical Storm Irma (1988) (T8819, 15W)
- Typhoon Irma (1989) (T8931, 34W)
- Tropical Storm Irma (1993) (T9301, 02W)
