= Typhoon Dot (1989) =

Pacific typhoon in 1989

Typhoon Dot (Kuring)
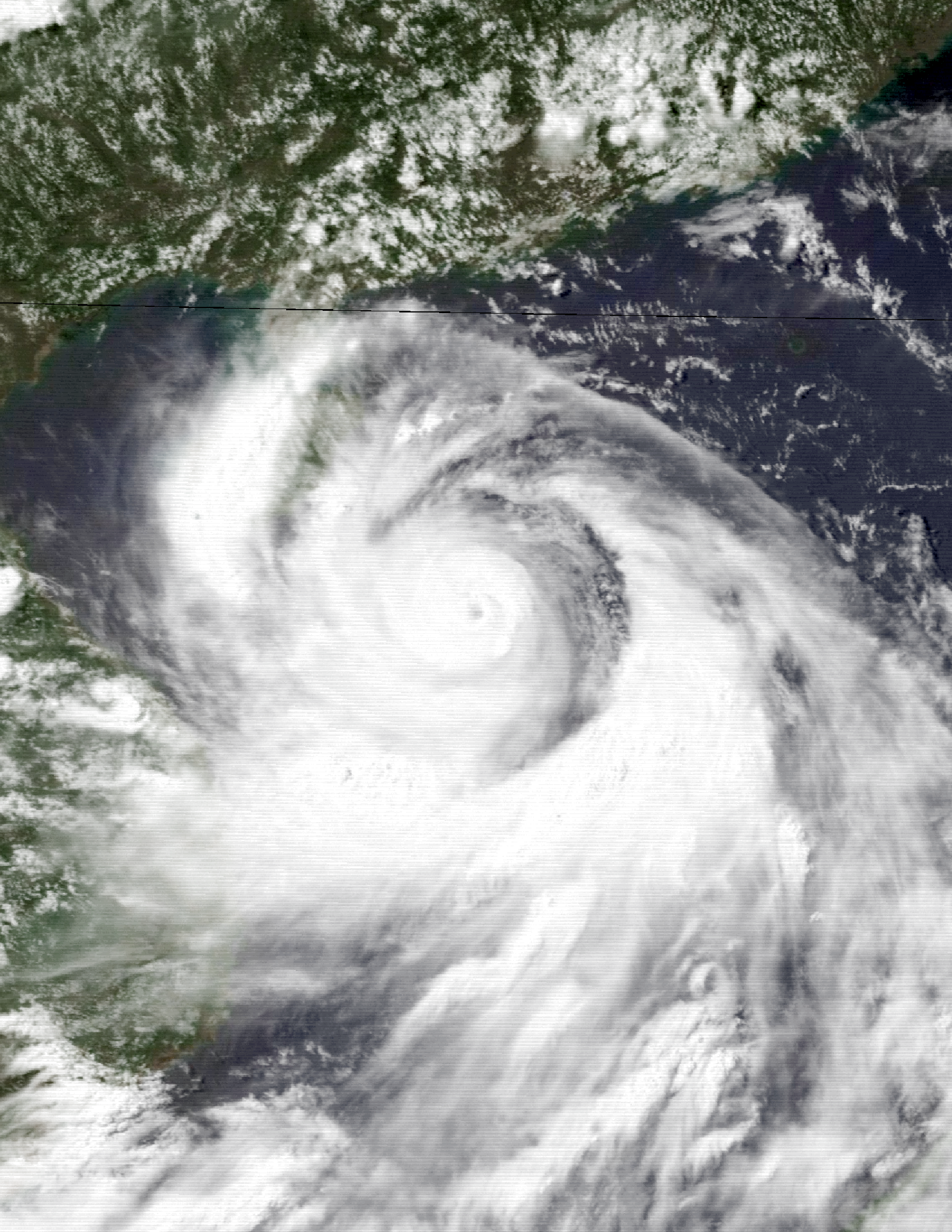
- Typhoon Dot approaching Hainan Island on June 9

Meteorological history
- Formed: June 4, 1989
- Dissipated: June 12, 1989

Typhoon
- 10-minute sustained (JMA)
- Highest winds: 150 km/h (90 mph)
- Lowest pressure: 955 hPa (mbar); 28.20 inHg

Category 3-equivalent typhoon
- 1-minute sustained (SSHWS/JTWC)
- Highest winds: 185 km/h (115 mph)
- Lowest pressure: 944 hPa (mbar); 27.88 inHg

Overall effects
- Fatalities: 8
- Missing: 1
- Damage: $45.1 million (1989 USD)
- Areas affected: Philippines, Hong Kong, China, Vietnam
- IBTrACS
- Part of the 1989 Pacific typhoon season

Typhoon Dot, known in the Philippines as Typhoon Kuring, was one of several tropical cyclones to impact southern China and northern Vietnam during the 1989 Pacific typhoon season. Originating from a tropical disturbance near Palau on June 4, Dot tracked west-northwestward towards the Philippines. Crossing the country on June 6, the system moved over the South China Sea and attained typhoon status. Late on June 8, Dot reached its peak intensity with winds estimated at 185 km/h (115 mph). The system weakened slightly the next day before making landfall in Hainan Island. A weakened storm then entered the Gulf of Tonkin before striking northern Vietnam and dissipating on June 12.

Throughout its course, Typhoon Dot produced heavy rains in the Philippines, China and Vietnam, resulting in significant damage and eight fatalities. The most severe impacts took place on Hainan Island where 1,400 homes were destroyed and another 60,000 were damaged. In Vietnam, Dot exacerbated flooding triggered in late May by Tropical Storm Cecil.

== Meteorological history ==
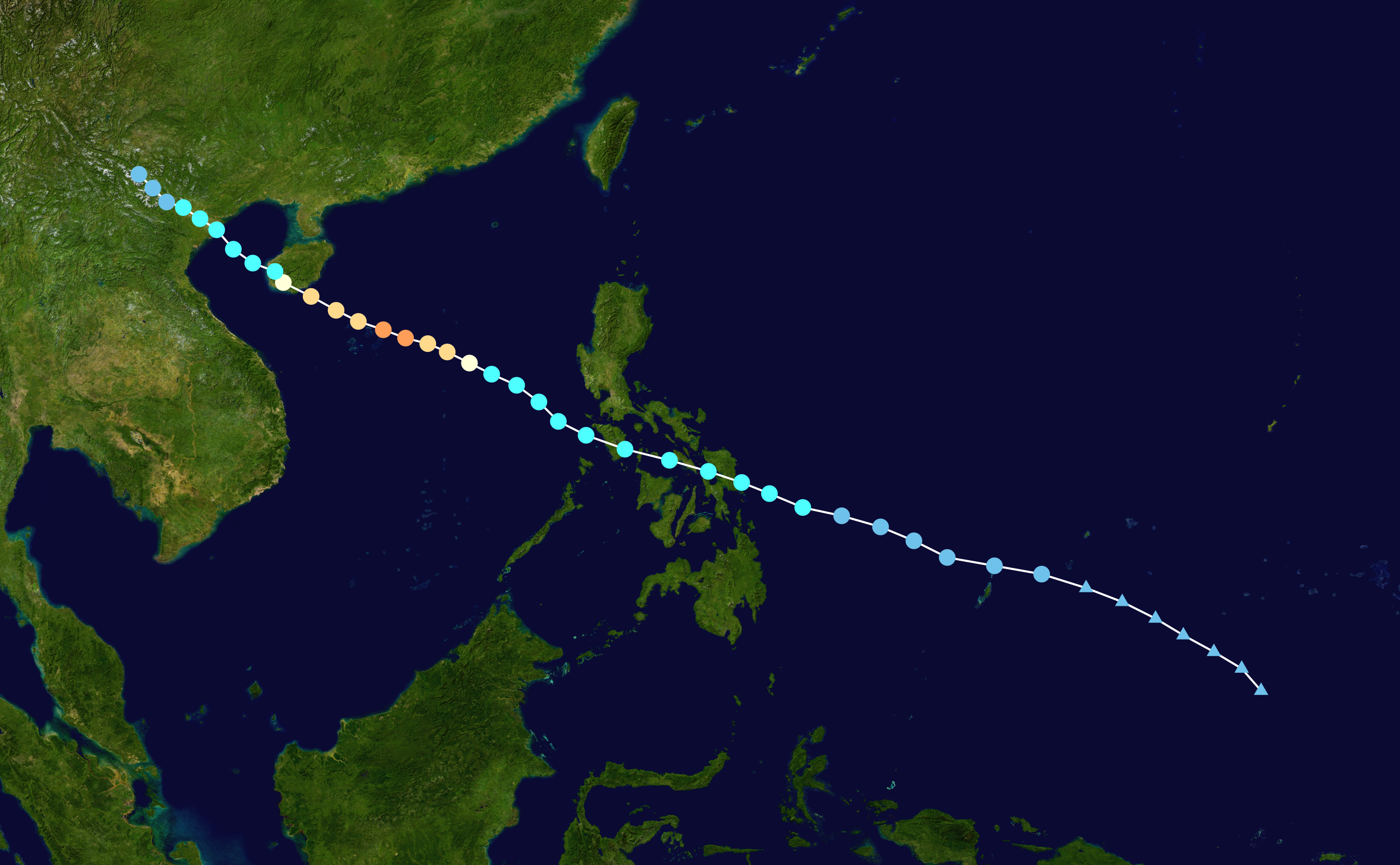
Map plotting the storm's track and intensity, according to the Saffir–Simpson scale Map key Saffir–Simpson scale Tropical depression (≤38 mph, ≤62 km/h) Tropical storm (39–73 mph, 63–118 km/h) Category 1 (74–95 mph, 119–153 km/h) Category 2 (96–110 mph, 154–177 km/h) Category 3 (111–129 mph, 178–208 km/h) Category 4 (130–156 mph, 209–251 km/h) Category 5 (≥157 mph, ≥252 km/h) Unknown Storm type Tropical cyclone Subtropical cyclone Extratropical cyclone, remnant low, tropical disturbance, or monsoon depression

In early June 1989, the Joint Typhoon Warning Center (JTWC) began monitoring a tropical disturbance that developed over the southern Philippine Sea. (Note: The Joint Typhoon Warning Center is a joint United States Navy – United States Air Force task force that issues tropical cyclone warnings for the western Pacific Ocean and other regions.) Over the following two days, convection associated with this system increased and became better organized. This development prompted the issuance of a Tropical Cyclone Formation Alert on June 4 as the system moved just north of Palau. By this time, the Japan Meteorological Agency (JMA) classified the system as a tropical depression. (Note: The Japan Meteorological Agency is the official Regional Specialized Meteorological Center for the western Pacific Ocean.) Early on June 5, the JTWC followed suit and issued their first advisory on Tropical Depression 05W, at which time the system was situated roughly 555 km (345 mi) southwest of the island of Samar in the Philippines. Due to the cyclone's proximity to the Philippines, the Philippine Atmospheric, Geophysical and Astronomical Services Administration also monitored the storm, assigning it with the local name Kuring. Tracking generally towards the west-northwest, the depression intensified into a Tropical Storm and was given the name Dot, 12 hours before making landfall in Samar on June 6.

Crossing over the central Philippines and the Sibuyan Sea, Tropical Storm Dot grew in size and intensity. By June 7, the storm entered the South China Sea and acquired a brief northerly component to its track. At the time, forecasters at the JTWC anticipated that Dot would interact with an approaching weather front and track north of Hainan Island. The front failed to materialize, however, and the storm resumed a west-northwesterly track. Owing to low wind shear and warm waters, Dot attained typhoon status on June 8. Following the development of an eye, the storm reached its peak intensity later that day as a Category 3 equivalent typhoon on the Saffir–Simpson hurricane scale, with maximum sustained winds estimated at 185 km/h (115 mph). By the morning of June 9, the JMA assessed Dot to have attained ten-minute sustained winds of 150 km/h (95 mph) and a barometric pressure of 955 mbar (hPa; 28.2 inHg).

Gradual weakening occurred as Dot neared Hainan Island on June 9. The typhoon subsequently made landfall near Sanya on June 10 and weakened to a tropical storm. Later that day, the storm emerged into the Gulf of Tonkin before making its third and final landfall near Hai Phong, Vietnam. Once onshore, Dot quickly degraded over the mountainous terrain of northern Vietnam, and was last noted on June 12.

== Impact ==
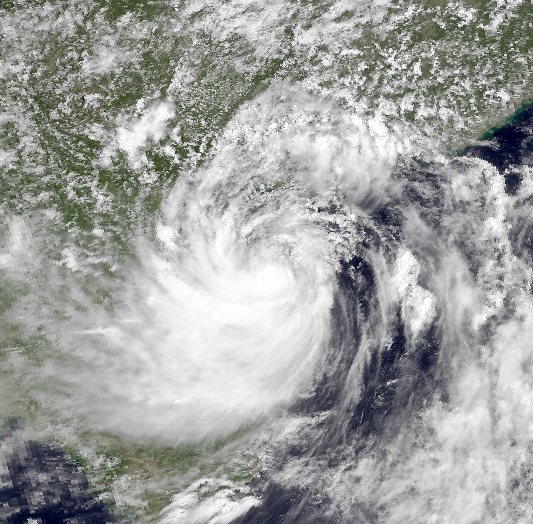
Typhoon Dot over Hainan Island on June 10

Tropical Storm Dot produced widespread rainfall in the Philippines, leading to several landslides. In Toledo City, the Carmen copper Concentrator had to temporarily shut down after a landslide disrupted the facility's water supply. As a result, the Atlas Consolidated Mining and Development Corporation lost approximately 272,000 kg (600,000 lb) of copper.

Across Hainan Island, the storm produced heavy rains and damaging winds that left eight cities without power or telephone service. Throughout Hainan, about 1,400 homes were destroyed and 60,000 more were damaged. Press reports indicated that two people died as a result of Typhoon Dot while another was listed as missing. Overall, damage in Hainan reached 170 million Renminbi (US$45.1 million). Three rescue teams were deployed to the region to assist in recovery efforts. In nearby Guangxi Province, heavy rains caused additional flooding that destroyed 300 homes and injured eight people. However, these rains also helped alleviate drought conditions in the region. At Tai Mo Shan in Hong Kong, sustained winds from Dot reached 79 km/h (49 mph) and gusts peaked at 110 km/h (70 mph). More than 55,000 hectares (140,000 acres) of crops were flooded, the majority of which were rice fields.

Roughly two weeks after Tropical Storm Cecil devastated parts of Vietnam, Dot caused further flooding along the Red River Delta. Portions of Hanoi were inundated with up to 1 m (3 ft). Winds up to 116 km/h (72 mph) reportedly affected coastal areas near where the typhoon moved ashore. Nearly 162,000 hectares (400,000 acres) of rice fields were submerged by the storm. At least six fatalities were attributed to the storm in Vietnam, and many more were injured.

== See also ==
- Other tropical cyclones named Dot
- Typhoon Angela (1989)
- Typhoon Dan (1989)
- Typhoon Elsie (1989)
