= Typhoon Hal (1985) =

Pacific typhoon in 1985

Typhoon Hal (Kuring)
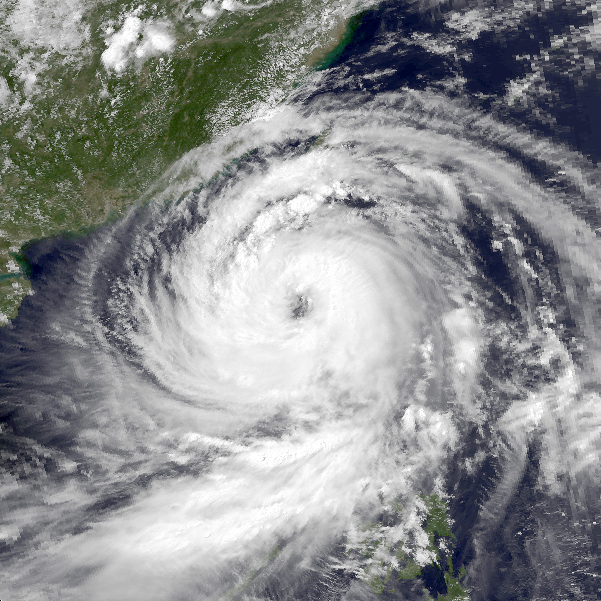
- Typhoon Hal on June 22

Meteorological history
- Formed: June 19, 1985
- Dissipated: June 25, 1985

Typhoon
- 10-minute sustained (JMA)
- Highest winds: 150 km/h (90 mph)
- Lowest pressure: 960 hPa (mbar); 28.35 inHg

Category 3-equivalent typhoon
- 1-minute sustained (SSHWS/JTWC)
- Highest winds: 185 km/h (115 mph)
- Lowest pressure: 950 hPa (mbar); 28.05 inHg

Overall effects
- Fatalities: 53
- Missing: 3
- Damage: $10.5 million (1985 USD)
- Areas affected: Philippines; Taiwan; Hong Kong; China
- IBTrACS
- Part of the 1985 Pacific typhoon season

Typhoon Hal, known in the Philippines as Typhoon Kuring, was the strongest cyclone to affect southern China since 1983. Hal originated from a monsoon trough that formed in early June 1985. The system gradually became better organized, and on June 20, the storm attained tropical storm. Intensification continued and the storm reached typhoon intensity later that day. On the evening of June 21, Hal reached peak intensity, before passing south of Taiwan. The storm weakened slightly on June 22, and lost typhoon intensity two days later. Later on June 24, Hal moved onshore northeast of Hong Kong. Hal dissipated three days later.

Across the Philippines, 46 people were killed, 10 of which perished due to drownings. Roughly 80% of one Pangasinan municipality was flooded. Widespread power outages were reported, and two radio towers were brought down. A total of 127,440 persons were directly affected by the typhoon. In all, about 13,000 families, or 77,000 people, were homeless and damage totaled $10.5 million. Throughout Taiwan, flooding occurred. There, seven people were killed and 15 others were injured. Prior to landfall in China, 200 shelters were opened, but only 19 people used these shelters. A total of 26 flights were cancelled in Hong Kong. Additionally, eight people were hurt and three others were reportedly missing.

== Meteorological history ==
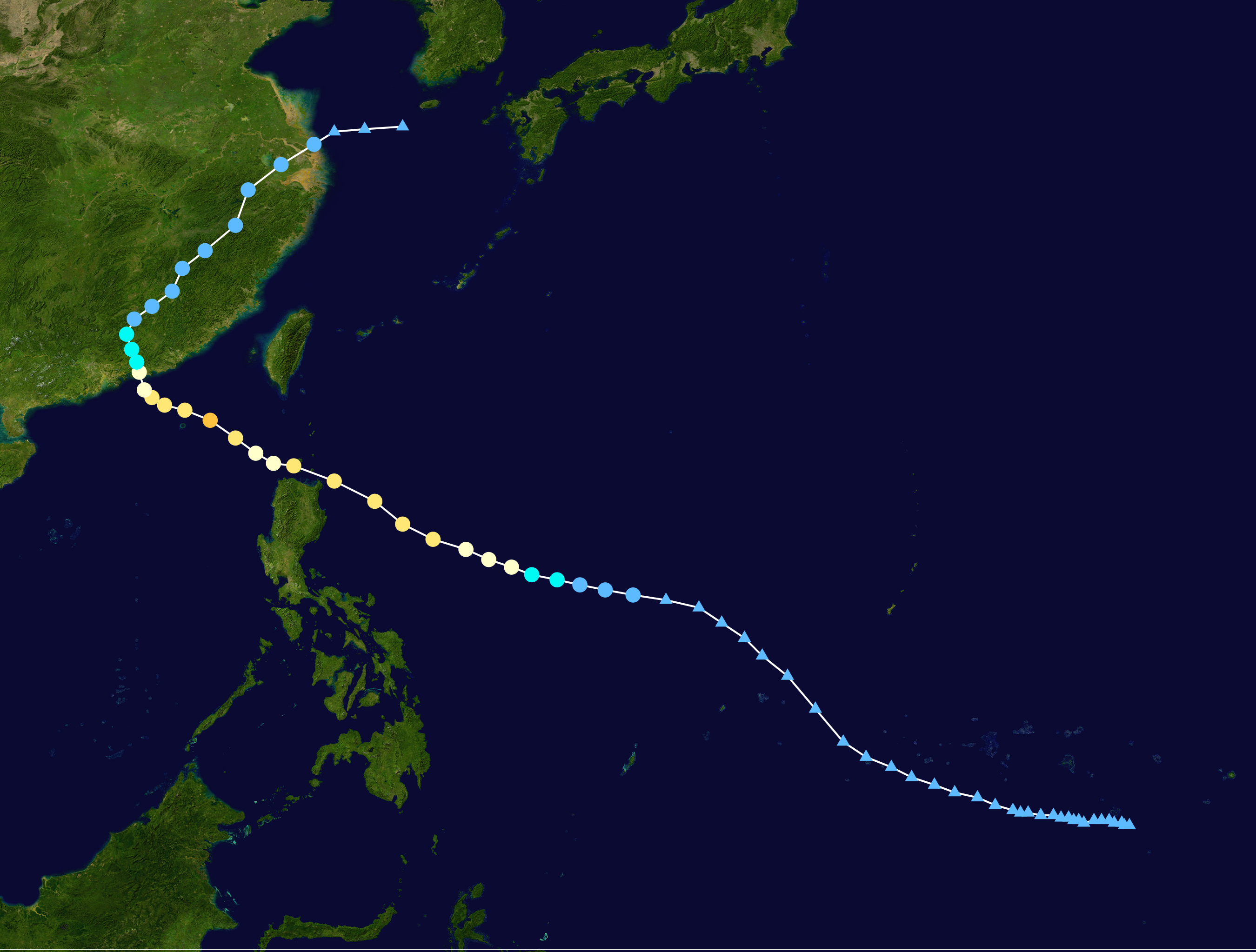
Map plotting the storm's track and intensity, according to the Saffir–Simpson scale Map key Saffir–Simpson scale Tropical depression (≤38 mph, ≤62 km/h) Tropical storm (39–73 mph, 63–118 km/h) Category 1 (74–95 mph, 119–153 km/h) Category 2 (96–110 mph, 154–177 km/h) Category 3 (111–129 mph, 178–208 km/h) Category 4 (130–156 mph, 209–251 km/h) Category 5 (≥157 mph, ≥252 km/h) Unknown Storm type Tropical cyclone Subtropical cyclone Extratropical cyclone, remnant low, tropical disturbance, or monsoon depression

Following the extratropical transition of Typhoon Gay on May 26, a spring-like weather pattern returned to the West Pacific, including a tropical upper-tropospheric trough (TUTT) and a strong ridge, which extended from the International Date Line to the Malay Peninsula. On June 1, the monsoon trough re-developed over the South China Sea. Thunderstorm activity increased considerably on June 8. Three days later, a weak disturbance was first noted just north of the equator. Although most of the convection was initially displaced from the center, the system began to show signs of organization on June 15. Three days later, the Joint Typhoon Warning Center (JTWC) issued a Tropical Cyclone Formation Alert (TCFA) for the disturbance. On June 19, the Japan Meteorological Agency (JMA) first identified the system; (Note: The Japan Meteorological Agency is the official Regional Specialized Meteorological Center for the western Pacific Ocean.) however, strong wind shear caused all the deep convection to become displaced to the south of the center. At 1800 UTC, wind shear began to decrease, and the cyclone developed a well-defined circulation. Based on this, the JTWC upgraded the system into Tropical Storm Hal. (Note: Wind estimates from the JMA and most other basins throughout the world are sustained over 10 minutes, while estimates from the United States-based Joint Typhoon Warning Center are sustained over 1 minute. 10 minute winds are about 1.14 times the amount of 1 minute winds.) Early the next day, the JMA classified Hal as a severe tropical storm. Around this time, the Philippine Atmospheric, Geophysical and Astronomical Services Administration also monitored the storm and assigned it with the local name Kuring.

Convection soon developed along the northern semicircle of the system, and thus Hal began to quickly intensify. At 1200 UTC on June 20, both the JTWC and the JMA estimated that Hal attained typhoon strength. Meanwhile, Hal tracked west-northwestward, while situated south of a ridge that extended west over China. However, both the JTWC and its primary tropical cyclone forecast model predicted Hal to move northward, and re-curve northeast. Around this time, the storm passed about 60 km (35 mi) north of Luzon. Late on June 21, the JMA estimated that Hal attained its peak intensity, with winds of 145 km/h (90 mph) and a minimum barometric pressure of 960 mbar (28 inHg).

Passing near Taiwan, the storm gradually weakened. At 1800 UTC on June 22, the JMA lowered the intensity of Hal to 135 km/h (85 mph). According to the JMA, the typhoon leveled off in intensity for roughly 30 hours, before weakening resumed. On the morning of June 24, the JMA downgraded Hal to a severe tropical storm. Five hours later, Hal moved ashore about 150 km (95 mi) northeast of Hong Kong at the same intensity. By June 26, the JTWC considered Hal dissipated. The next day, the JMA followed suit and ceased watching the system.

== Preparations, impact, and aftermath ==
When it became apparent that the storm posed a threat to the Philippines, typhoon alerts were issued for much of Luzon, including the nation's capital city of Manila. Although Hal ultimately passed north of the Philippines, Luzon bore the brunt of the typhoon, enduring widespread flooding and significant crop damage. Forty-six people were killed in the Philippines: fatalities included two individuals who drowned when a river overflowed its banks in the Zambales province; a 24-year-old man electrocuted in Manila; a man who became entrapped in a vehicle; three people caught in a landslide; three civilians and a soldier swept down a torrential river; and ten fisherman aboard a stricken ship.

A total of 5,242 families were evacuated, including 50 in Baguio and 89 in Olongapo City. In Laoag, 225 houses were destroyed. Approximately 100 people moved to higher ground in the Pangasinan province. Roughly 80% of the nearby Santa Barbara municipality was flooded. According to press reports, 200 homes were either damaged or destroyed in the province of Ilocos Norte. Elsewhere, in the province of Cagayan, the typhoon damaged 7,500 acres (3,000 ha) of rice and 175,000 acres (71,000 ha) of corn. Widespread power outages were reported, and roads leading to Bagio were closed. Two radio towers were brought down. A total of 127,440 people were directly affected due to the system. In all, 13,518 families or 77,542 persons were left homeless and damage totaled $10.5 million.

Offshore, eight people were injured on the U.S. Naval ship Kirk when a large wave crashed over the bow. Another boat, USB Oldendorf, sustained significant damage due to the heavy seas, and 22 of its occupants required rescue. Many of the rescued received minor injuries. A total of 13 people were rescued from the imperiled ship Offshore Patrick. Following the passage of Typhoon Hal in the Philippines, 4,000 bags of food, 200 bags of clothes, and 400 bags of medicine were provided via airlift. A few days after Hal, the nation was later affected by Typhoon Irma.

Hal brought heavy rains to much of Taiwan especially along the eastern portion of the island nation, where 9 in (230 mm) of precipitation was measured. These rains resulted in flooding, which led to most of the damage. Seven fatalities occurred due to the storm, including five others were initially reported as missing. A 41‑year‑old woman died due to the collapse of a wooden house. Six people were swept away, including an 11-year-old boy that died and two others were initially rendered as missing. A total of 15 were hurt across the nation, including one child and two farmers.

After passing near the Philippines and Taiwan, Hal threatened southern China, becoming the first significant tropical cyclone to do so since Typhoon Ellen in 1983. A total of 200 shelters were opened in Hong Kong, but only 19 people used the shelters. Many schools and business were closed, including all stock markets within Hong Kong. Typhoon Hal brought strong winds to much of southern China. At the Royal Observatory, Hong Kong, winds of 41 km/h (25 mph) and wind gusts of 91 km/h (57 mph) were recorded. A peak wind gust of 93 km/h (58 mph) was observed in the Hong Kong International Airport. Heavy rains were also reported, which led to mudslides. The southern Fujian province was hardest hit, where over 100,000 people were stranded. Ferry service to Macao was cancelled. A total of 14 incoming and 12 out coming flights from Hong Kong were cancelled. Throughout the area, three farmers were reported missing and eight minor injuries were reported. Overall, damage in China was minimal.

== See also ==
- Typhoon Ellen (1983) – last major storm to hit China before Hal
