= Typhoon Dot (1985) =

Pacific typhoon in 1985

Typhoon Dot (Saling)
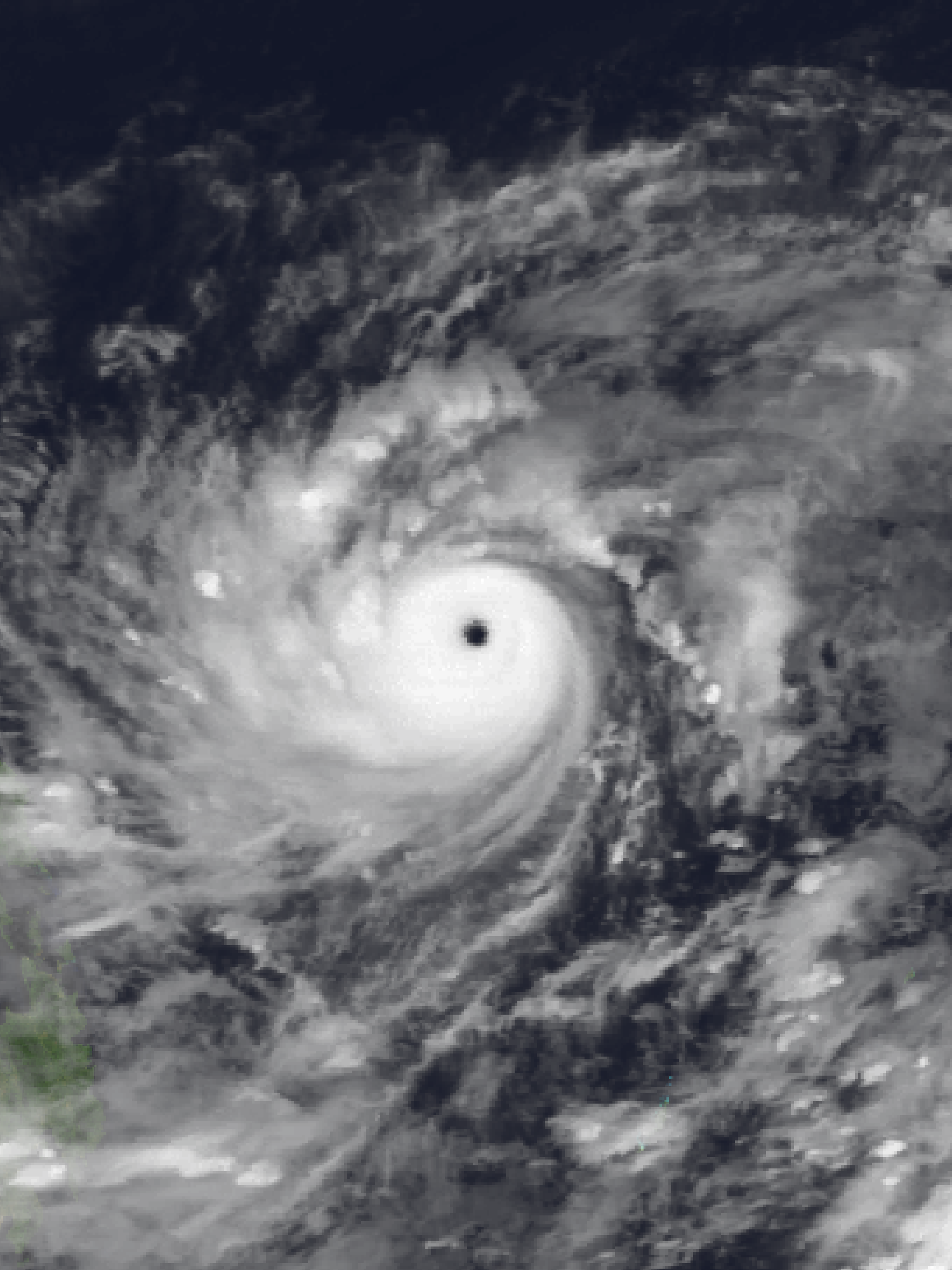
- Dot nearing the Philippines near peak intensity on October 16

Meteorological history
- Formed: October 13, 1985
- Dissipated: October 22, 1985

Violent typhoon
- 10-minute sustained (JMA)
- Highest winds: 220 km/h (140 mph)
- Lowest pressure: 895 hPa (mbar); 26.43 inHg

Category 5-equivalent super typhoon
- 1-minute sustained (SSHWS/JTWC)
- Highest winds: 280 km/h (175 mph)
- Lowest pressure: 897 hPa (mbar); 26.49 inHg

Overall effects
- Fatalities: 90
- Damage: $105 million (1985 USD)
- Areas affected: Philippines, Hainan, Vietnam
- IBTrACS
- Part of the 1985 Pacific typhoon season

Typhoon Dot, known in the Philippines as Super Typhoon Saling, was the strongest storm of the 1985 season. Dot originated from a small area of thunderstorm activity in early to mid October. The system was first classified on October 11, and steadily intensified over the next few days. Dot attained typhoon strength on October 15, and subsequently entered a period of explosive deepening, which was not anticipated by forecasters. The next day the intensification rate slowed, but that evening, Dot attained its maximum intensify. A steady weakening trend began on October 17, though the system maintained typhoon intensity through the passage of the Philippines. After entering the South China Sea late on October 18, Dot briefly re-intensified, only to weaken as it approached Vietnam. On October 21, Dot struck Vietnam while still a typhoon, but dissipated the next day over the high terrain of the nation.

Although damage across the Philippines was less than initially expected, the typhoon lashed the nation with heavy rains. Province of Nueva Ecija suffered the worst effects from Dot. There, 500,000 acres (200,000 ha) of crops and 90% of all buildings were damaged. In Cabanatuan, 2,500 homes and 90% of structures were destroyed. Overall, 42 towns were flooded, forcing a total of 125,000 people to flee their homes, 35,000 of which were homeless. Furthermore, 52,933 houses were leveled while an additional 200,450 were damaged. Nationwide, 24 were hurt. While tracking through the South China Sea, Dot passed through Hainan Island. There, two casualties occurred while 34 others suffered injuries. Across the island, over 2,300 dwellings were destroyed. In all, Dot was responsible for 90 deaths and $104.9 million (1985 USD) in damage.

== Meteorological history ==
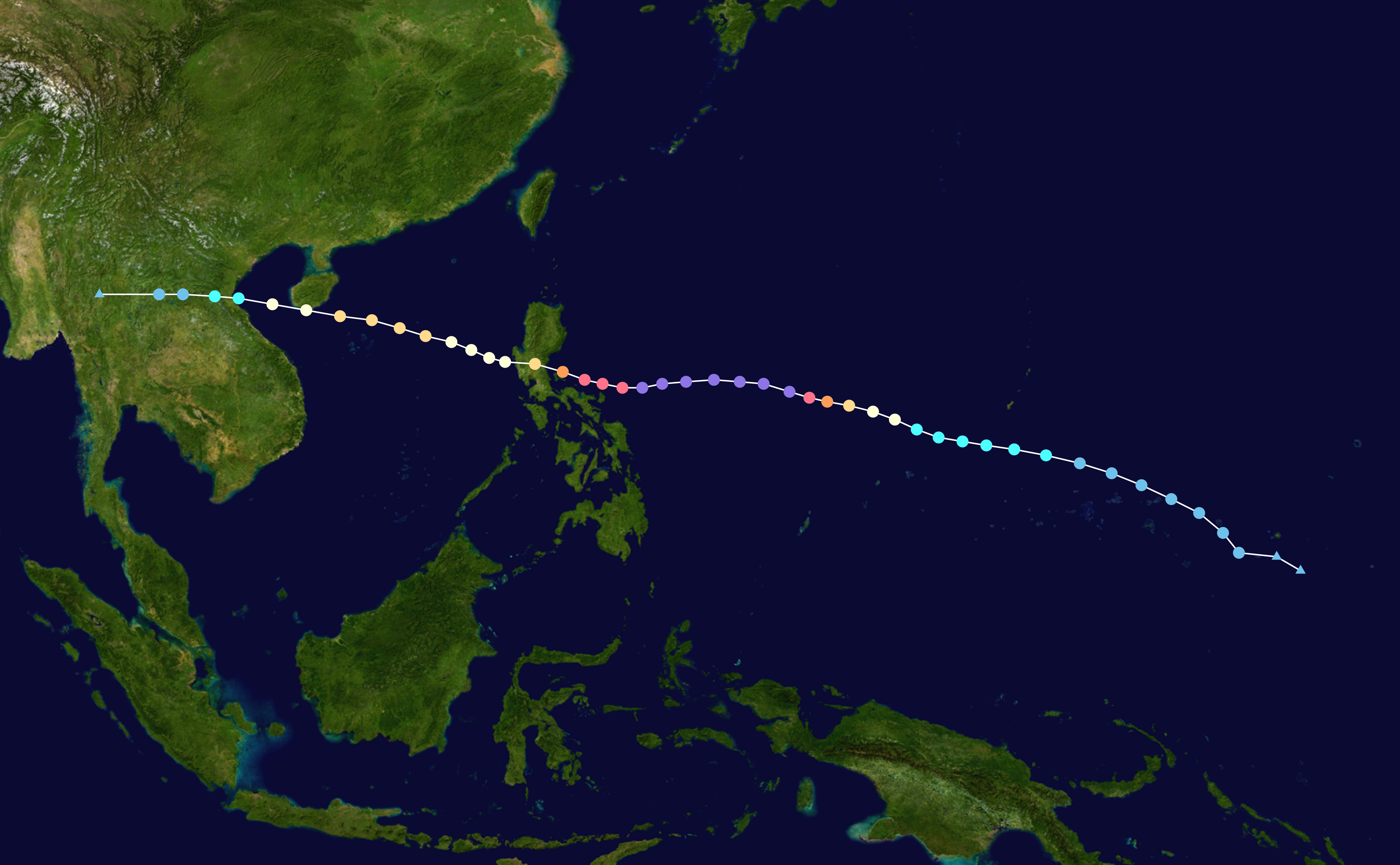
Map plotting the storm's track and intensity, according to the Saffir–Simpson scale Map key Saffir–Simpson scale Tropical depression (≤38 mph, ≤62 km/h) Tropical storm (39–73 mph, 63–118 km/h) Category 1 (74–95 mph, 119–153 km/h) Category 2 (96–110 mph, 154–177 km/h) Category 3 (111–129 mph, 178–208 km/h) Category 4 (130–156 mph, 209–251 km/h) Category 5 (≥157 mph, ≥252 km/h) Unknown Storm type Tropical cyclone Subtropical cyclone Extratropical cyclone, remnant low, tropical disturbance, or monsoon depression

Following the extratropical transition of Typhoon Brenda on October 5, a mid-level subtropical ridge became centered over the northwestern Pacific, which resulted in an absence of the typical southwesterly monsoon flow typically seen during the autumn. Satellite imagery first detected an area of convection roughly 280 km (170 mi) southeast of Ponape on October 11. At 1200 UTC, the Japan Meteorological Agency (JMA) first identified the system. (Note: The Japan Meteorological Agency is the official Regional Specialized Meteorological Center for the western Pacific Ocean.) The next day, the storm's outflow became better defined as the storm tracked west-northwest. On October 13, wind shear began to decrease, and the cyclone developed a well-defined circulation. Based on this, the Joint Typhoon Warning Center (JTWC) upgraded the system into Tropical Storm Dot. (Note: Wind estimates from the JMA and most other basins throughout the world are sustained over 10 minutes, while estimates from the United States-based Joint Typhoon Warning Center are sustained over 1 minute. 10 minute winds are about 1.14 times the amount of 1 minute winds.) That evening, the JMA followed suit. The newly upgraded Dot was situated in an area of strong easterly winds, and thus the JTWC correctly predicted to the system to continue west-northwest, despite forecasts from various tropical cyclone forecast models that showed otherwise. Dot steadily strengthened during this period, and midday on October 14, the JMA classified Dot as a severe tropical storm. Several hours later, the JTWC upgraded Dot into a typhoon, with the JMA following early on October 15. Around this time, the Philippine Atmospheric, Geophysical and Astronomical Services Administration (PAGASA) also monitored the storm and assigned it with the local name Saling.

Shortly after attaining typhoon intensity, Dot entered a period of explosive intensification. However, this was not expected by forecasters at the JTWC nor the forecast models due to the presence of dry air. At 0600 UTC on October 15, the JTWC revised the intensity to 165 km/h (105 mph), equivalent to a mid-level Category 2 hurricane on the United States–based Saffir-Simpson Hurricane Wind Scale (SSHWS). That evening, the JMA increased the intensity of Dot to 165 km/h (105 mph), making it the strongest tropical cyclone of the season. At 2300 UTC on October 15, Hurricane Hunters measured a minimum barometric pressure of 906 mbar (26.8 inHg), a drop of 63 mbar (1.9 inHg) over the previous 23 hours, equal to a drop 2.8 mbar (0.083 inHg) per hour. This rate exceeded the threshold of explosive intensification, which according to the JTWC, is 2.5 mbar (0.074 inHg) per hour. Based on the aforementioned aircraft reports, the JTWC increased the intensity to 260 km/h (160 mph) at 0000 UTC on October 16. By this time, Dot had developed a well-defined eye surrounded by very cold cloud tops. However, the JTWC also noted that both the storm's radius of maximum winds and central dense overcast were unusually small.

By October 16, Dot's rate of deepening had leveled off. At midday, the JTWC estimated that Dot attained peak intensity of 280 km/h (175 mph) while the JMA placed the storm's wind speed at 220 km/h (135 mph). After maintaining this intensity until the morning of October 17, Dot started a gradual weakening trend while passing directly over Samar Island and encountering increased wind shear. Around this time, radar imagery showed that Dot displayed a small pinhole eye 5 to 8 km (3.1 to 5.0 mi) in diameter. On the afternoon of October 18, the typhoon made landfall along southern Luzon. At this time, the JTWC reported an intensity of 205 km/h (125 mph) and the JMA assigned the storm's intensity at 165 km/h (105 mph). That evening, Dot re-emerged into the South China Sea while still at typhoon intensity. Continuing west-northwest, Dot quickly became better organized. According to the JTWC, Dot reaches its secondary peak intensity of 165 km/h (105 mph) midday on October 20 while situated roughly 550 km (340 mi) south-southwest of Hong Kong. Meanwhile, the JMA raised the storm's intensity to 140 km/h (85 mph). Also around this time, the typhoon exited PAGASA's warning zone. After brushing Hainan Island, Dot resumed weakening. Early on October 21, Dot moved ashore in northern Vietnam, around 240 km (150 mi) south of Hanoi. At the time of its second landfall, the JTWC estimate Dot's intensity at 145 km/h (90 mph), while the JMA estimate was lower, at 110 km/h (70 mph). Land interaction with the high terrain of the nation resulted in rapid weakening, and by 0000 UTC October 22, the JTWC ceased tracking Dot. The JMA followed suit 12 hours later.

== Preparations, impact and aftermath ==
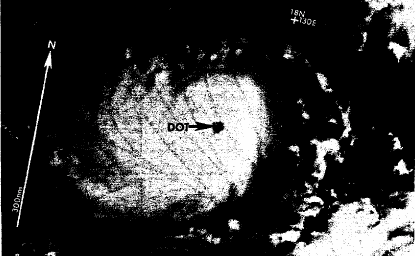
Typhoon Dot near peak intensity

Due to the impending threat of Dot, storm signals were raised along the north and central Philippines. The metropolis of Manila was placed on typhoon alert, forcing the mobilization of emergency crews. Seven domestic and two military flights were called off. Additionally, railway and shipping services were cancelled. All United States military installations in the Philippines were placed in a Tropical Cyclone Condition of Readiness and two airbases, Clark Air Base and Cubi Point NAS, were evacuated. Schools and many offices were shut down in preparation of Dot.

Typhoon Dot was the strongest tropical cyclone to directly strike the Bicol Region of the Philippines since Typhoon Irma in 1981. Although the storm brought heavy rains to much of Philippines, damage was less than initially expected due to the storm's compact size. In Davao Del Sur, 10 people were killed and several homes were destroyed due to mudslides. A man was swept away in a landslide in Legaspi, which also forced the evacuation of 165 families. The worst effects of the storm were felt in Nueva Ecija. There, 202,345 ha (500,000 acres) of crops and 90% of all buildings were damaged, totaling to $5.3 million (1985 USD). Offshore, three people were killed and 16 others were rendered missing when a cargo ship sunk. Seven fatalities occurred in Cabanatuan, where 2,500 homes were demolished and 22,000 were damaged. Ninety percent of all infrastructure was destroyed. Flooding in low-lying areas of Manila forced the evacuation of 29,000. Elsewhere, 69,000 houses were flooded in Pampanga, Tarlac, and Nueva Ecija. In all, 42 towns were flooded, which forced a total of 125,000 people to flee their homes, 35,000 of which were homeless. Overall, 52,933 homes were destroyed while an additional 200,450 were damaged. Throughout the Philippines, 24 people were hurt, and 88 perished, and over 1 million people were directly affected. Nationwide, damage totaled $104.9 million. This included $92.8 million in property damage and less than $1 million in agriculture.

During the aftermath of the storm, the governor of Nueva Ecija requested President Ferdinand Marcos to declare the province a disaster area. Additionally, UNICEF was asked to provide water-purifying tablets. The Philippine Red Cross, Philippine government, local authorities and civic organizations provided relief assistance in the immediate aftermath of the storm. Despite private appeals for up to $1.4 million for reconstruction aid, the Philippine government did not submit a request for international aid. However, by October 25, eight non-government relief agencies provided relief, which totaled $1.15 million. Furthermore, the government of Switzerland provided $8,061 worth of aid.

After passing the Philippines, Typhoon Dot skirted Hainan Island, leaving two dead. Communications were lost in Sanya, the southernmost city in the island. Thirty-four were hurt. A total of 50,000 homes and 83,000 acres of farmland were flooded. More than 2,300 houses also collapsed. Along the China mainland, heavy rains were recorded, although damage was minor.

== See also ==
- Other tropical cyclones named Dot
- Other tropical cyclones named Saling
- Typhoon Nancy (1982)
- Typhoon Utor (2013)
- Typhoon Haiyan (2013)
- Typhoon Goni (2020)
- Typhoon Vamco (2020) – a typhoon which took a comparable trajectory to Dot.
- Typhoon Noru (2022) – a tropical cyclone that had a similar track as Dot's.
