= List of storms named Dot =

The name Dot was used for fourteen tropical cyclones in Pacific Ocean: two in the central Pacific and twelve in the northwest Pacific.

In the central Pacific:

- Hurricane Dot (1959) – peaked as Category 4 hurricane prior to making landfall on Kauai, Hawaii.
- Hurricane Dot (1970) – formed northwest of Hawaii, peaked as a Category 1 hurricane; did not affect land.

In the northwest Pacific:

- Typhoon Dot (1955) (T5508)
- Super Typhoon Dot (1961) (T6128, 66W) – affected Iwo Jima
- Typhoon Dot (1964) (T6424, 36W, Enang) – made landfall twice, affected the Philippines, Hong Kong and eastern China
- Tropical Storm Dot (1967) (T6709, 10W) – affected the Ryūkyū Islands
- Typhoon Dot (1973) (T7305, 05W) – made landfall just east of Hong Kong
- Tropical Storm Dot (1976) (T7615, 15W) – scraped the coast of China near Shanghai before making landfall while dissipating on the Korean Peninsula
- Tropical Storm Dot (1979) (T7904, 04W, Karing) – affected most of The Philippines
- Typhoon Dot (1982) (T8212, 13W, Miding) – made landfall in China.
- Typhoon Dot (1985) (T8522, 21W, Saling) – made landfall in the Philippines, brushed the southern coast of Hainan, made second landfall in Vietnam
- Typhoon Dot (1989) (T8905, 05W, Kuring) – made landfall on Hainan, weakening before a third landfall in Vietnam
- Typhoon Dot (1990) (T9017, 17W) – made landfalls in Taiwan and China
- Typhoon Dot (1993) (T9318, 24W) – made landfall in the Philippines Turned away from Hainan at the last moment to make landfall on mainland China.
