= Typhoon Kujira (2003) =

Pacific typhoon in 2003

Typhoon Kujira (Amang)
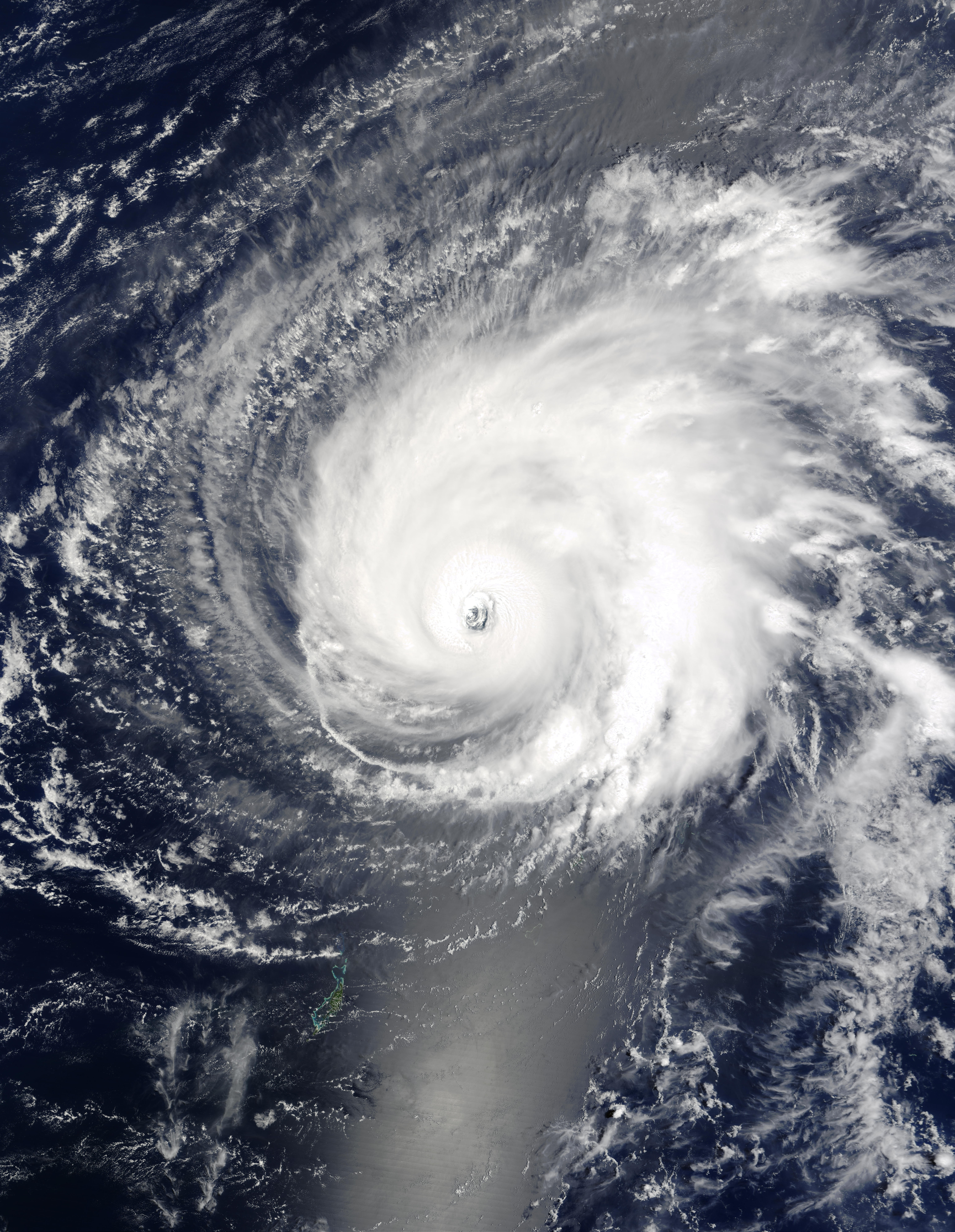
- Typhoon Kujira at peak intensity on April 16

Meteorological history
- Formed: April 9, 2003
- Extratropical: April 25, 2003
- Dissipated: April 30, 2003

Very strong typhoon
- 10-minute sustained (JMA)
- Highest winds: 165 km/h (105 mph)
- Lowest pressure: 930 hPa (mbar); 27.46 inHg

Category 4-equivalent super typhoon
- 1-minute sustained (SSHWS/JTWC)
- Highest winds: 250 km/h (155 mph)
- Lowest pressure: 904 hPa (mbar); 26.70 inHg

Overall effects
- Fatalities: 3 total
- Damage: $230,000 (2003 USD)
- Areas affected: Micronesia; Philippines; Taiwan; Japan
- IBTrACS
- Part of the 2003 Pacific typhoon season

Typhoon Kujira, (Note: The name Kujira (Japanese: クジラ, [kɯ̟ʑiɾa̠]) was contributed by Japan and refers to the constellation Cetus, the whale, in Japanese.) known in the Philippines as Typhoon Amang, was a long-lived tropical cyclone that lasted for 16 days and affected the island nations of Micronesia, Taiwan, and Japan in mid April 2003, as well as the earliest typhoon in a calendar year to ever make landfall on the latter. Forming from a broad area of disturbed weather as a tropical depression on April 9 well removed from any landmasses, Kujira quickly intensified in its early stages, and was upgraded to a tropical storm just two days after cyclogenesis. Strengthening slowed afterwards, though the storm attained typhoon intensity on April 14. Intensification continued and late on April 15, Kujira reached its peak intensity with winds of 165 km/h (103 mph) (Note: All maximum sustained wind figures were measured over a period of ten minutes, unless otherwise noted.) and a minimum barometric pressure of 930 mbar (hPa; 27.46 inHg). Following peak intensity, Kujira began to track northwest and oscillate in strength, cresting an additional two times in intensity. On April 21, the typhoon was downgraded to tropical storm intensity and began to track erratically for several days east of Taiwan. However, on April 24, Kujira resumed a northward track and begin to weaken, and on April 24 was downgraded to tropical depression strength as it made landfall on Kyushu. Following landfall Kujira transitioned into an extratropical cyclone and continued to persist before these extratropical remnants crossed the International Dateline towards the end of April 2003.

Shortly after developing, Kujira caused two fatalities in Pohnpei in addition to minor agricultural and infrastructure damage; similar effects were felt in Guam. Several days later, the typhoon prompted cyclone warnings and other precautionary measures in the Philippines after forecasts indicated the potential for strong winds and rain. However, effects on the island chain associated with the storm remained minimal. The typhoon also prompted warning products in Taiwan, making it the first April typhoon since 1978 to cause such a feat. Unlike in the Philippines, however, Kujira would bring significant rainfall to Taiwan. Effects from the typhoon were most significant in Japan, particularly in the Ryukyu Islands. Strong winds, rain, and waves caused US$230,000 (¥27.8 million) (Note: All damage totals are in 2003 USD unless otherwise noted.) in agricultural damage on Ishigaki Island. One person was killed due to injuries resulting from the waves. In Kyushu, heavy rainfall, peaking at 196 mm (7.7 in) in Ōita Prefecture, was reported. Overall, despite its distance away from land and weak intensity at the time of its sole landfall, Kujira resulted in three fatalities.

== Meteorological history ==
Map plotting the storm's track and intensity, according to the Saffir–Simpson scale Map key Saffir–Simpson scale Tropical depression (≤38 mph, ≤62 km/h) Tropical storm (39–73 mph, 63–118 km/h) Category 1 (74–95 mph, 119–153 km/h) Category 2 (96–110 mph, 154–177 km/h) Category 3 (111–129 mph, 178–208 km/h) Category 4 (130–156 mph, 209–251 km/h) Category 5 (≥157 mph, ≥252 km/h) Unknown Storm type Tropical cyclone Subtropical cyclone Extratropical cyclone, remnant low, tropical disturbance, or monsoon depression

The systems that would develop into Typhoon Kujira began as a broad area of convection on April 6 centered south of Pohnpei and near the equator. At the time, the area of disturbed weather exhibited multiple circulation centers, and thus the system remained generally disorganized. On April 8, however, the convection began to consolidate towards a common center within an area of low wind shear. As such, both the Japan Meteorological Agency (JMA) and Joint Typhoon Warning Center (JTWC) classified the storm system as a tropical depression at 0000 UTC on April 9. For much of the cyclone's early existence, the low-level circulation center remained east of the primary convection cell as it tracked northward. Nonetheless, the JTWC upgraded the depression to tropical storm intensity just six hours after cyclogenesis, while the JMA continued to classify the system as a tropical depression.

Intensification was more gradual following April 9. At 0000 UTC on April 11, the JMA upgraded the system to tropical storm intensity, thus identifying it with the name Kujira. At roughly the same time, Kujira began to curve towards a westward track due to a high pressure area to the north. Concurrently the ambient wind shear abated and the storm further consolidated, allowing for more quicker strengthening. Throughout the following day, Kujira developed a banding eye feature that would later consolidate into a distinct circular eye; this was reflected with an upgrade to typhoon status by both the JTWC and JMA at 1800 UTC on April 12 and 0000 UTC on April 14, respectively. On April 14, a shortwave trough caused Kujira to track slightly more northwestward. Marked intensification continued, and late on April 15, the JTWC upgraded the typhoon to super typhoon intensity, the first of the year, while Kujira was located 400 km (250 mi) north-northwest of Yap State. At roughly the same time Kujira reached its peak intensity with winds of 165 km/h (105 mph). Estimated 1-minute sustained winds at that time were 250 km/h (155 mph), equivalent to that of a Category 4 hurricane on the Saffir–Simpson wind scale. Following peak intensity, Kujira continued to track westward as it entered the area of responsibility of the Philippine Atmospheric, Geophysical and Astronomical Services Administration (PAGASA) at 1200 UTC on April 16, and as such the name Amang was assigned to the typhoon by the agency. (Note: The PAGASA assigns names to tropical cyclones that enter their area of responsibility, regardless of its official JMA designation. This name is used locally and for PAGASA tropical cyclone monitoring purposes.)

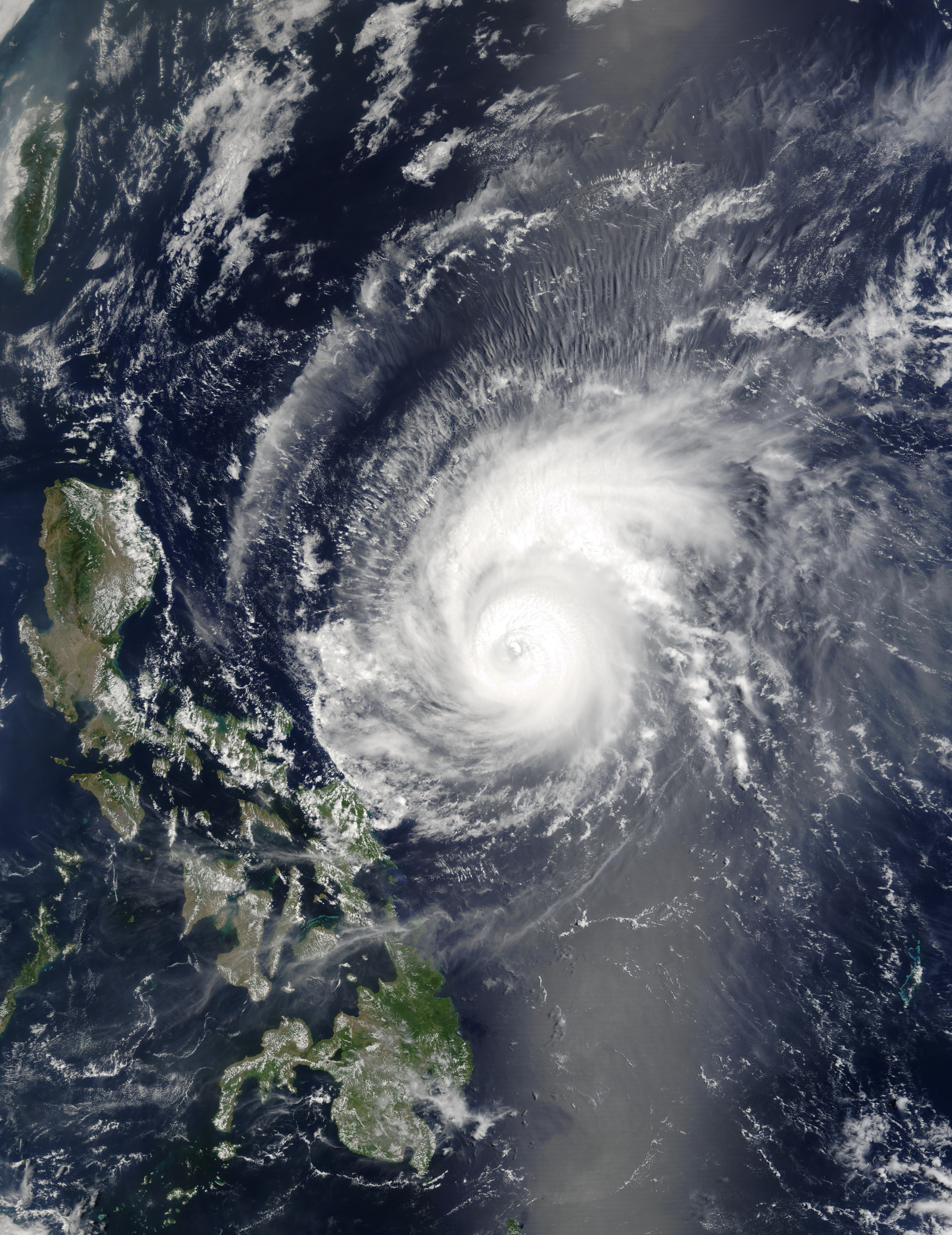
Typhoon Kujira off the Philippines on April 19

On April 17, the tropical cyclone began to track slightly southwestward and encountered an area of dry air and enhanced wind shear, thus temporarily weakening Kujira. Despite the prolonged effects from these inhibitors, the typhoon restrengthened to a secondary peak intensity the following day. Though the JTWC indicated a significant increase in maximum sustained winds, the intensification was only reflected by the JMA with a slight drop in barometric pressure. Over the next two days Kujira would begin to track more northward due to a weakness in the nearby subtropical ridge and oscillate in strength due to an eyewall replacement cycle; a tertiary peak in strength occurred on April 20 before subsequent weakening. This trend continued, and at 1800 UTC on April 21, both the JMA and JTWC downgraded Kujira to tropical storm status. Following the system's downgrade, Kujira became quasi-stationary due to the presence of two nearby high pressure areas, and its motion became erratic. Despite hostile atmospheric conditions, the tropical storm remained intact with persistent, deep convection and organized rainbands. Late on April 23, however, the cyclone began to drift towards the north as it made its closest approach to Taiwan. Throughout the following day, Kujira continued to accelerate towards the northeast and weaken at the same time. At 1200 UTC on April 24, PAGASA ceased issuing advisories on the storm as it had exited the agency's area of responsibility. At 0300 UTC the next day, the JMA downgraded the storm to tropical depression intensity while the JTWC ceased monitoring of the system three hours later. At roughly the same time, Kujira made landfall near Ushibuka, Kumamoto at the same intensity. Weakening continued, and the JMA continued to classify the system as a tropical depression until 1200 UTC on April 25, when it transitioned into an extratropical cyclone. The JMA continued to track the extratropical remnants of Kujira until they crossed the International Dateline on April 30.

== Preparations and impact ==
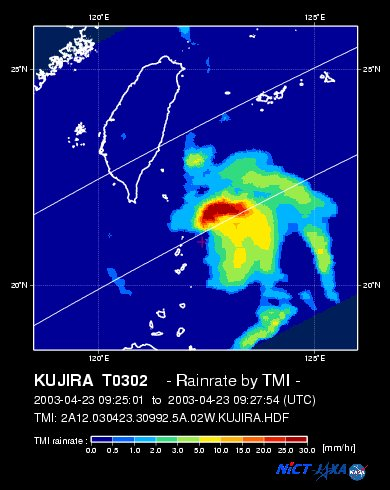
Estimated rainfall rate within Tropical Storm Kujira on April 23 as documented by the TRMM

Shortly after forming, Kujira tracked near Pohnpei, resulting in heavy rainfall across the island, peaking at 250 mm (9.8 in). Despite the typhoon's far distance from the island, two people were killed – one died after being crushed by a prostrated tree, while the other was killed offshore for unknown reasons. It also caused minor damage to buildings and crops on the island. The outer rainbands of the typhoon later brought gale-force winds and heavy precipitation as it passed well south of Guam. Afterwards, the storm remained well removed from landmasses for a period of time. On April 18, however, PAGASA issued a public storm warning signal No. 1 for Catanduanes in the Philippines due to the likelihood for gusty winds and rainfall. As Kujira neared the archipelago, the No. 1 warning was expanded to include the Babuyan Islands while a No. 2 warning was introduced for the Batanes Islands in northern Philippines. In preparation for the typhoon, the National Disaster Coordinating Council readied regional disaster coordinating councils and contingency plans while the Armed Forces of the Philippines prepared for any potential emergency situation. The Philippine Coast Guard patrolled Filipino waters throughout Kujira's close passage in order to redirect ships away from the typhoon. Though the typhoon had also threatened to cancel the biennial San Fernando Race, the concurrent SARS outbreak which had impacted the Philippines ultimately resulted in its cancelling. Eventually any effects in the Philippines remained minimal.

As Kujira began to track towards Taiwan, the Taiwanese government issued land- and sea-based warnings in advance of the storm. The local weather bureau specifically alerted vessels off the southern and southeastern coasts of the island. Continued strengthening of Kujira prompted the Central Weather Bureau to issue medium typhoon warnings for several portions of Taiwan, though these warnings were downgraded to light typhoon status following the subsequent weakening of the typhoon on April 22. This made Kujira the first April typhoon to prompt the issuance of any cyclone-related warnings in Taiwan since 1978. Impacts on the island were expected to be limited to rainfall, though the forecasted precipitation was also expected to lessen ongoing drought conditions. However, mudslides were also a potential impact from the typhoon. The National Fire Administration and Taiwan Power Company developed a contingency plan for the typhoon and had also undertaken other precautionary measures. Airports on Orchid Island and Green Island were closed. The resultant rainfall from Kujira's outer rainbands would be some of the most significant for the island in several months.

Effects from Kujira in Japan were of the greatest extent as opposed to other regions. Several flights were cancelled due to poor visibility in Ehime Prefecture as a result of cloudy conditions onset by the nearby typhoon, and roughly 1,800 passengers were affected by these cancellations. Similar flight delays and cancellations also occurred in Kōchi Prefecture. As Kujira approached Japan, the storm brought rough seas to the Ryukyu Islands, where wave heights of 2.5 m (8.2 ft) were recorded. In Okinawa, a woman was swept away by the wave action. Though she was later rescued and transported to a nearby hospital, she later died of resulting injuries. Further south, on Ishigaki Island, intense rainfall and near-record high wind gusts were reported. These combined effects caused US$230,000 (¥27.8 million) in agricultural damage spread out over an area of 190 hectares (470 acres). However, the heaviest rainfall associated with Kujira in Japan were on Kyushu. There, precipitation peaked at 196 mm (7.7 in) in Shakadake, Ōita Prefecture. Five other locations, all of which were on Kyushu, reported rainfall totals in excess of 125 mm (4.9 in). Upon its final landfall near Ushibuka, Kumamoto, Kujira became the earliest typhoon in any given calendar year to make landfall in Japan.

== See also ==
- Tropical cyclones in 2003
- Weather of 2003
- Other tropical cyclones named Kujira
- Other tropical cyclones named Amang
- List of tropical cyclones near the Equator
- Typhoon Rita (1972)
- Typhoon Nat (1991)
- Typhoon Meari (2004)
- Typhoon Maysak (2015)
