= Typhoon Lee (1981) =

Pacific typhoon in 1981

Typhoon Lee (Dinang)
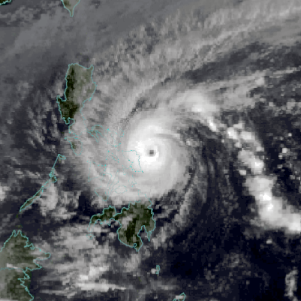
- Lee on December 25

Meteorological history
- Formed: December 22, 1981
- Dissipated: December 29, 1981

Typhoon
- 10-minute sustained (JMA)
- Highest winds: 150 km/h (90 mph)
- Lowest pressure: 950 hPa (mbar); 28.05 inHg

Category 2-equivalent typhoon
- 1-minute sustained (SSHWS/JTWC)
- Highest winds: 175 km/h (110 mph)
- Lowest pressure: 948 hPa (mbar); 27.99 inHg

Overall effects
- Fatalities: 188
- Damage: $74 million (1981 USD)
- Areas affected: Philippines
- IBTrACS
- Part of the 1981 Pacific typhoon season

Typhoon Lee, known in the Philippines as Typhoon Dinang, was the second storm to affect the Philippines during December 1981. Lee originated from an area of thunderstorm activity near the Truk Atoll towards the end of December. Following an increase in organization, the system was classified as a tropical cyclone on December 22. After becoming a tropical storm, Lee began to slowly strengthen, and attained typhoon status on December 24. While turning west towards the Philippines, Lee began to intensify more rapidly. It is estimated to have reached peak intensity the next day, with winds of 145 km/h (90 mph). At peak intensity, the storm moved ashore the central Philippines later on December 25. Lee emerged into the South China Sea the following day as a tropical storm. Initially, the storm maintained its intensity, but soon began to weaken due to increased wind shear. By December 28, all of the thunderstorm activity was removed from the center, and on December 29, Lee dissipated. However, the remnants of the cyclone was last noted a few hundred kilometers south of Hong Kong.

Across the Philippines, Typhoon Lee killed 188 people. In addition, 674,619 people were directly affected by the typhoon. Furthermore, 76,169 dwellings were demolished while 39,586 families, or 208,336 people, were rendered as homeless. A total of 53,314 houses were partially damaged. Also, 548,525 people sought refuge in shelters. Additionally, 1,586 individuals were injured due to Lee. Overall, damage totaled to $74.1 million (1981 USD), $46.4 million of which was from infrastructure and an additional $2.2 million came from agriculture. (Note: All currencies are converted to United States Dollars using Philippines Measuring worth with an exchange rate of the year 1981.)

The island of Samar sustained the worst damage caused by the storm. There, 82 fatalities were reported and 56 were injured. A total of 19,390 people were displaced; roughly 8,000 families or 48,000 people was forced to move to evacuation centers. Elsewhere, in the coastal town of Calapan, 5,600 dwellings received damage, and 85% of the coastal town's residents were displaced from their homes.

== Meteorological history ==
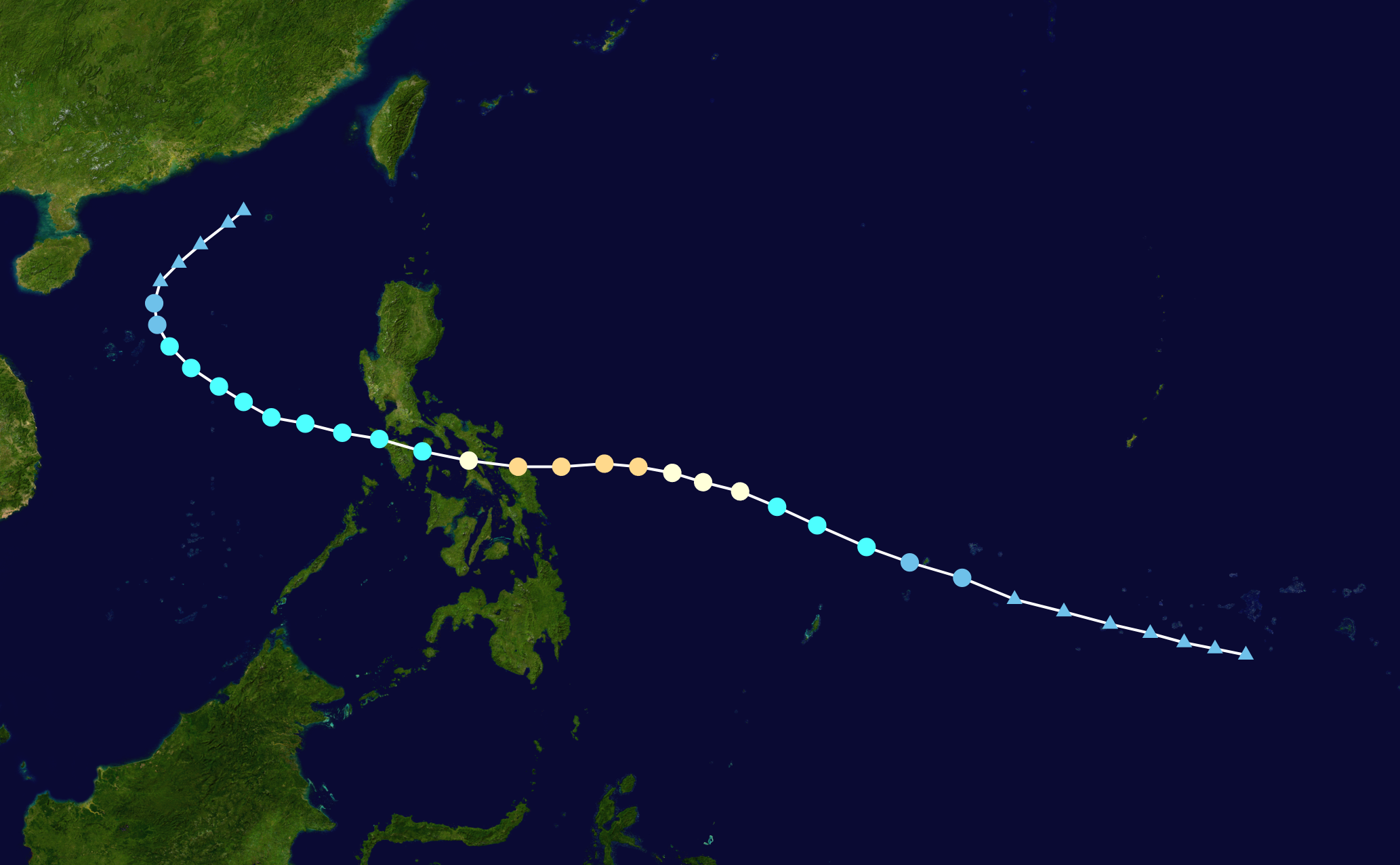
Map plotting the storm's track and intensity, according to the Saffir–Simpson scale Map key Saffir–Simpson scale Tropical depression (≤38 mph, ≤62 km/h) Tropical storm (39–73 mph, 63–118 km/h) Category 1 (74–95 mph, 119–153 km/h) Category 2 (96–110 mph, 154–177 km/h) Category 3 (111–129 mph, 178–208 km/h) Category 4 (130–156 mph, 209–251 km/h) Category 5 (≥157 mph, ≥252 km/h) Unknown Storm type Tropical cyclone Subtropical cyclone Extratropical cyclone, remnant low, tropical disturbance, or monsoon depression

On December 21, 1981, an area of convection began to organize west of the Truk Atoll. Despite strong wind shear, Hurricane Hunter aircraft data yielded winds of near-gale force and a barometric pressure of 1002 mbar (29.6 inHg) the next day. Initially, the aircraft did not find any evidence of a closed low-level circulation. At 1000 UTC on December 22, the Joint Typhoon Warning Center (JTWC) issued a Tropical Cyclone Formation Alert (TCFA) for the system. Two hours later, the JTWC upgraded the disturbance into Tropical Depression 29 following the discovery of a closed surface circulation by Hurricane Hunters. By that evening, thunderstorm activity had become more concentrated towards the center; as such, the Japan Meteorological Agency (JMA) first classified the system as a tropical cyclone. (Note: The Japan Meteorological Agency is the official Regional Specialized Meteorological Center for the western Pacific Ocean.) Following a further increase in organization, both the JMA and JTWC upgraded the cyclone into Tropical Storm Lee early on December 23. (Note: Wind estimates from the JMA and most other basins throughout the world are sustained over 10 minutes, while estimates from the United States-based Joint Typhoon Warning Center are sustained over 1 minute. 10 minute winds are about 1.14 times the amount of 1 minute winds.) Meanwhile, the Philippine Atmospheric, Geophysical and Astronomical Services Administration (PAGASA) also monitored the storm and assigned it with the local name Dinang.

Initially, Lee veered west-northwest due to a mid-latitude trough exiting off the Asia mainland. At 0600 UTC on December 23, the JTWC classified Lee as a typhoon. At 0000 UTC on December 24, the JMA upgraded Lee into a severe tropical storm. Six hours later, the agency classified Lee as a typhoon. Around this time, the JTWC predicted that Lee would turn north after entering the South China Sea due to the influence of an extratropical cyclone. However, as the storm turned west because the trough had moved away, the JTWC kept prolonging the northward turn. Moving in the general direction of the Philippines, Lee began to rapidly intensify. At 0600 UTC on December 25, the JTWC reported winds of 180 km/h (110 mph), equivalent to a high-end Category 2 hurricane on the United States-based Saffir-Simpson Hurricane Wind Scale. According to the JTWC, this would be the storm's peak intensity. Meanwhile, the JMA estimated peak intensity of 145 km/h (90 mph) and a minimum pressure of 950 mbar (30 inHg). That afternoon, the typhoon made landfall along the central portion of the Philippines.

After landfall, rapid weakening occurred, and when the storm entered the South China Sea on December 26, the JTWC reduced the winds of Lee to 70 km/h (45 mph). Despite this, data from the JMA suggests that system was stronger, with winds of 105 km/h (65 mph). Based on additional reports from Hurricane Hunters, the JTWC revised its forecast and now anticipated the tropical cyclone to move on a westerly course and strike central Vietnam. Moving into an area of decreased monsoonal flow, Lee maintained its intensity for 18 hours. Satellite imagery showed a banding-type eye. However, by December 27, Lee began to feel the effects of an extratropical cyclone located to the north of the storm; consequently, Lee began to make a gradual turn towards the northwest. Lee began to encounter increased vertical wind shear, and early on December 27, the JMA lowered the intensity of Lee to 105 km/h (65 mph). Later that day, a Hurricane Hunter investigation recorded a pressure of 998 mbar (29.5 inHg) as the storm began to turn towards the north, exiting PAGASA's warning zone. By 0000 UTC on December 28, all of the deep convection was displaced from the center. Six hours later, the JMA estimated that Lee weakened to winds below tropical storm force. By midday, satellite imagery suggested that Lee was no longer a tropical cyclone; however, the JTWC continued to issue warnings on the system until 0000 UTC on December 29. At 1800 UTC, the JMA stopped watching the system. The remnants of Lee were last noted by the JTWC roughly 275 km (170 mi) south of Hong Kong.

== Preparations and impact ==
Prior to landfall, twelve provinces, including some in Luzon, were placed on typhoon alert. Upon moving through the central Philippines, Typhoon Lee affected some of the same areas devastated by Typhoon Irma earlier that month, which was considered the strongest storm to affect the island since 1970. Lee knocked out communications and left many coconut-producing areas isolated. Railway services to and from Manila was suspended. Even though nine domestic flights were canceled, Manila International Airport remained open throughout the passage of the typhoon. Across Manila, some flooding was reported and high winds tore off some Christmas decorations in hotels along the bay. The Sorsogon Province was one of the hardest hit areas by the typhoon; 20 casualties happened there because of flooding. In the coastal region of Legaspi, home to a large volcano, 150 houses were demolished due to storm surge, 25 of which were swept out at sea. Telephone lines were also cut off for four days in the city. Storm surge was also noted in coastal towns in the Sorsogon, Masbate, and Albay provinces. In the latter, three villages were damaged. Just south of the capital city of Manila, in the coastal town of Calapan on Mindoro Island, 5,600 houses were damaged, and 20,000 persons or 85% of the town's residents were left without a home. Two fatalities were reported in the city. In the fishing village of San Fernando on Masbate Island, 50 thatched huts were flattened. Elsewhere, four people were killed and three others injured in Naujan, where 86 homes were either damaged or destroyed.

According to officials, 82 people were killed on the island of Samar. Throughout the island, the system destroyed schools, residences, an airport terminal, the government house in Catarman, and a jail, enabling 11 prisoners to escape. Most of damage to Samar was caused by collapsing houses and uprooted coconut trees hurled by the gusty winds. A total of 19,390 people were displaced; roughly 8,000 families or 48,000 people of which were forced to move to evacuation centers. An additional 56 people were hurt province-wide. Ten homes were washed away along a coastal village in the Marinduque Province. One person also perished due to electrocution outside of Naga City.

One hundred eighty-eight people were killed, primarily due to drownings. Another 674,619 people were directly affected by the typhoon. A total of 76,169 dwellings were demolished, and 39,586 families, or 208,336 people, were displaced. This total included approximately 6,000 people in the provinces of Romblon, Quezon, and Albay. Overall, a total of 53,314 homes were partially damaged. Moreover, 548,525 people sought refuge in shelters. Additionally, 1,586 persons were injured due to Lee. Overall, damage totaled to $74.1 million, including $46.4 million from infrastructure and $2.2 million from agriculture. Damage was estimated at $44 million in Samar.

== Aftermath ==
Within a few days after the passage of Typhoon Lee, relief agencies were deployed to distribute food and medicines to families temporarily housed in schools, town halls and churches. Philippine President Ferdinand E. Marcos declared an emergency and a "state of calamity" in the provinces of Northern Samar, Masbate, Mindoro Oriental, and Romblon. He subsequently released $1.8 million in order to repair roads, bridges and schools. Several evacuation centers were opened up in schools and town halls.

== See also ==
- List of storms named Lee
- Typhoon Irma (1981)
- Typhoon Nock-ten (2016)
