= List of storms named Akang =

The name Akang has been used for five tropical cyclones in the Philippine Area of Responsibility in the Western Pacific, all named by PAGASA:

- Tropical Storm Mamie (1982) (T8201, 01W, Akang) – made landfall in the Philippines
- Typhoon Judy (1986) (T8601, 01W, Akang) – remained east of the Philippines
- Tropical Storm Nathan (1990) (T9003, 05W, Akang) – crossed the Philippines as a tropical depression
- Tropical Depression Akang (1994) (01W) – only recognized by PAGASA and JTWC
- Tropical Depression Akang (1998) (01W) – only recognized by PAGASA and JTWC

== See also ==
Similar names that have been used for tropical cyclones:

- Tropical Storm Aka (1990) – a Central Pacific tropical cyclone that crossed into the Western Pacific Ocean
- List of storms named Amang – also used in the Western Pacific Ocean
- List of storms named Atang – was replaced by Akang in the Western Pacific Ocean; also used in the South-West Indian Ocean
