= List of storms named Daling =

The name Daling has been used for nine tropical cyclones in the Western Pacific Ocean, all named by PAGASA or its predecessor, the Philippine Weather Bureau:

- Tropical Storm Vera (1965) (T6504, 05W, Daling) – a tropical storm that did not last long.
- Tropical Depression Daling (1969) – a tropical depression that was only tracked by the Philippine Weather Bureau.
- Typhoon Iris (1973) (T7310, 10W, Daling) – a typhoon that affected the Ryukyu Islands and South Korea.
- Tropical Depression 04W (1977) (04W, Daling) – a short-lived tropical depression that hit South China.
- Tropical Storm Kelly (1981) (T8106, 06W, Daling) – a deadly severe tropical storm that caused widespread damage in the Bicol Region of the Philippines.
- Typhoon Irma (1985) (T8506, 06W, Daling) – a relatively strong typhoon that severely impacted the Philippines despite staying offshore, before eventually making landfall in Japan.
- Tropical Storm Ellis (1989) (T8906, 06W, Daling) – a fairly strong early-season severe tropical storm that affected Japan.
- Tropical Depression Daling (1993) – a weak system that hit southern Mindanao and dissipated in the Sulu Sea shortly thereafter.
- Typhoon Peter (1997) (T9708, 09W, Daling) – a typhoon that paralleled the Philippine coast before making landfall in Japan.

== See also ==
Similar names that have been used for tropical cyclones:

- Typhoon Dale (1996) – a Category 5-equivalent super typhoon in the Western Pacific Ocean.
- List of storms named Deling – also used in the Western Pacific Ocean.
- List of storms named Dolly – used in five tropical cyclone basins.
- List of storms named Saling – also used in the Western Pacific Ocean.
