= List of storms named Saling =

The name Saling has been used for seven tropical cyclones in the Western Pacific Ocean, all named by PAGASA or its predecessor, the Philippine Weather Bureau:

- Typhoon Mary (1965) (T6518, 21W, Saling) – an intense, Category 5-equivalent super typhoon that affected the Ryukyu Islands, Taiwan and China.
- Tropical Storm Lorna (1969) (T6918, 22W, Saling) – a late-season severe tropical storm that meandered in the Philippine Sea but dissipated before making landfall.
- Tropical Storm Harriet (1977) (T7716, 16W, Saling) – a fairly strong severe tropical storm that stayed at sea.
- Tropical Depression Saling (1981) – a short-lived tropical depression that was only monitored by PAGASA.
- Typhoon Dot (1985) (T8522, 21W, Saling) – a powerful typhoon that affected the Philippines, Hainan and northern Vietnam, ultimately killing 90 people.
- Typhoon Dan (1989) (T8926, 29W, Saling) – a relatively weak but destructive typhoon that caused widespread damage in the Philippines and Vietnam, claiming 101 lives.
- Tropical Storm Winona (1993) (T9312, 18W, Saling) – a tropical storm that crossed the Philippines before brushing South China and making its final landfall in Vietnam.

== See also ==
Similar names that have been used for tropical cyclones:

- List of storms named Daling – also used in the Western Pacific Ocean.
- List of storms named Sally – used in the Western Pacific Ocean and three other tropical cyclone basins.
