= List of storms named Amang =

The name Amang has been used for six tropical cyclones in the Philippine Area of Responsibility by PAGASA in the Western Pacific Ocean.

- Typhoon Kujira (2003) (T0302, 02W, Amang) – caused minimal effects in the Philippines
- Typhoon Yutu (2007) (T0702, 02W, Amang) – an early-season super typhoon
- Tropical Depression Amang (2011) (02W, Amang) – did not affect the Philippines but impacted the Mariana Islands
- Tropical Storm Mekkhala (2015) (T1501, 01W, Amang) – an early-season tropical storm
- Tropical Depression Amang (2019) (01W, Amang) – killed 10 people in the Philippines due to landslides and flash floods
- Tropical Depression Amang (2023) – made two landfalls in the Philippines

Preceded by	Pacific typhoon season names Amang	Succeeded by Betty

== See also ==
Similar names that have been used for tropical cyclones:

- List of storms named Akang – also used in the Western Pacific Ocean
- List of storms named Atang – used in the Western Pacific Ocean and in the South-West Indian Ocean
- List of storms named Emang – used in the Western Pacific Ocean and in the South-West Indian Ocean
