= List of storms named Sally =

The name Sally has been used for thirteen tropical cyclones worldwide: one in the Atlantic Ocean, nine in the Western Pacific Ocean, two in the Australian region, and one in the South Pacific Ocean.

In the Atlantic Ocean:

- Hurricane Sally (2020) – a slow-moving Category 2 hurricane that made landfall in Alabama, contributing to heavy precipitation totals in the Gulf Coast of the United States.

In the Western Pacific Ocean:

- Typhoon Sally (1954) (T5421) – a Category 5-equivalent super typhoon that was miles from making landfall in the Philippines before curving back into open waters.
- Tropical Storm Sally (1959) (T5902, 03W)
- Typhoon Sally (1961) (T6122, 54W) – a Category 1-equivalent typhoon.
- Typhoon Sally (1964) (T6418, 27W, Aring) – a Category 5-equivalent super typhoon that caused widespread agricultural damage in Guam and made landfall in the Philippines at that intensity. Later became the fourth typhoon to affect Hong Kong during the 1964 season and contributed to the heaviest rainfall in over two decades in the Seoul area, killing at least 211 people.
- Typhoon Sally (1967) (T6702, 02W, Bebeng) – a Category 2-equivalent typhoon.
- Tropical Storm Sally (1970) (T7005, 05W) – did not affect land.
- Typhoon Sally (1972) (T7229, 31W) – a Category 1-equivalent typhoon that made landfall in Thailand.
- Typhoon Sally (1976) (T7608, 08W, Isang) – a Category 4-equivalent typhoon that affected the Caroline Islands.
- Typhoon Sally (1996) (T9623, 23W, Maring) – a Category 5-equivalent super typhoon that made landfall in the Leizhou Peninsula.

In the Australian region:

- Cyclone Sally (1971) – a Category 4 severe tropical cyclone that made landfall in Australia.
- Cyclone Sally (2005) – a Category 2 tropical cyclone that did not affect land.

In the South Pacific Ocean:

- Cyclone Sally (1986) – a Category 3 severe tropical cyclone that affected the Cook Islands.

== See also ==
- List of storms named Saling – a similar name that has also been used in the Western Pacific Ocean.
