= Typhoon Irma (1981) =

Pacific typhoon in 1981

Typhoon Irma (Anding)
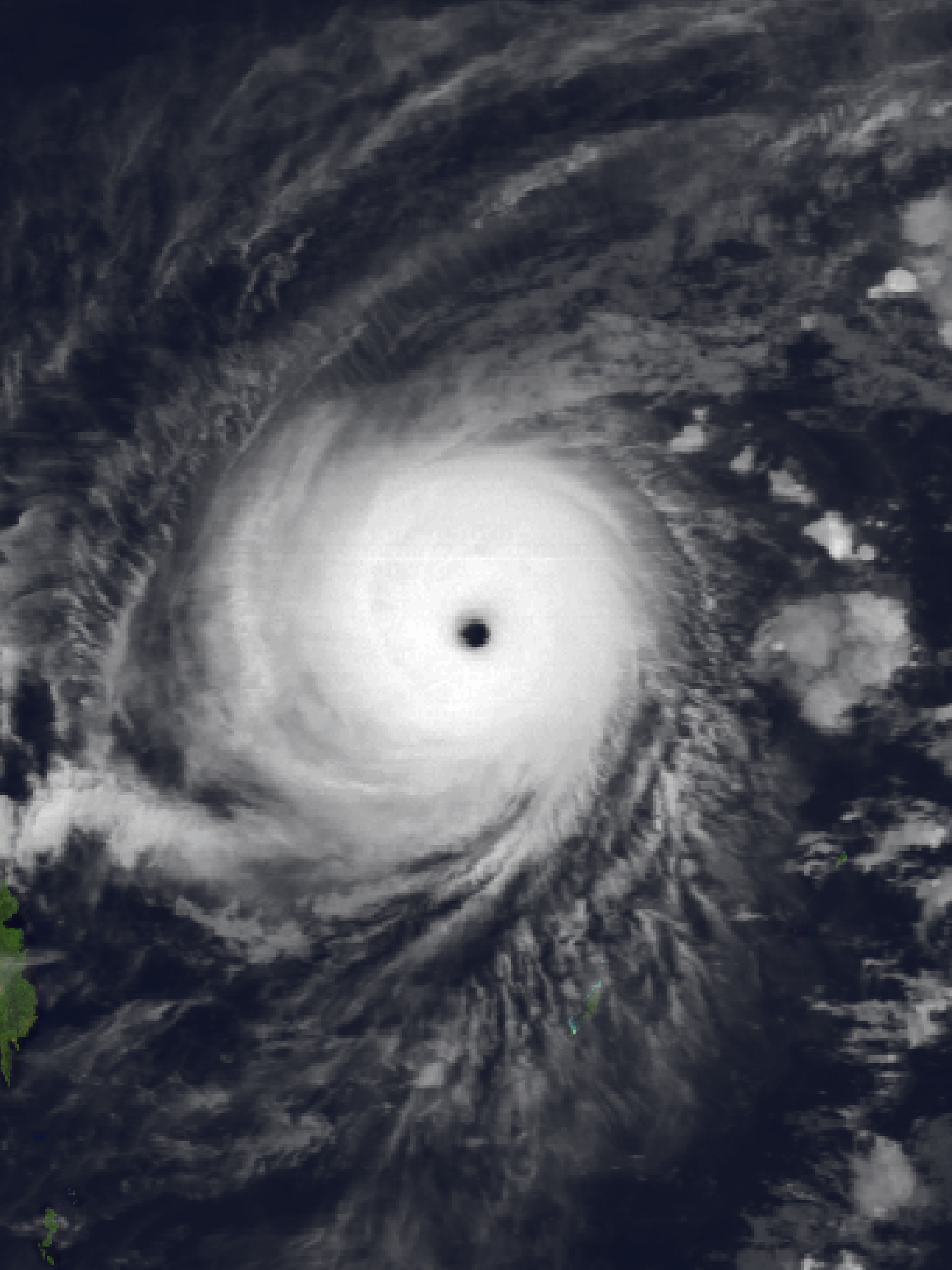
- Irma near peak intensity on November 22

Meteorological history
- Formed: November 18, 1981
- Dissipated: November 27, 1981

Violent typhoon
- 10-minute sustained (JMA)
- Highest winds: 205 km/h (125 mph)
- Lowest pressure: 905 hPa (mbar); 26.72 inHg

Category 4-equivalent super typhoon
- 1-minute sustained (SSHWS/JTWC)
- Highest winds: 250 km/h (155 mph)
- Lowest pressure: 902 hPa (mbar); 26.64 inHg

Overall effects
- Fatalities: 595
- Damage: $63.3 million (1981 USD)
- Areas affected: Philippines
- IBTrACS
- Part of the 1981 Pacific typhoon season

Typhoon Irma, known in the Philippines as Super Typhoon Anding, was a powerful typhoon that struck the Philippines in November 1981. The twenty-fifth named storm and fourteenth typhoon of the 1981 Pacific typhoon season, Irma originated from an active monsoon trough to the east of the Philippines. Following an increase in organization, the system was first classified on November 18 and was subsequently upgraded into a tropical storm on the next day as it moved westward. After passing near Guam, Irma continued to deepen, and was estimated to have attained typhoon intensity early on November 21. The intensification rate accelerated thereafter, and on the afternoon of November 22, Irma reached its peak wind speed of 205 km/h (125 mph). After maintaining this intensity for 16 hours, Irma weakened considerably due to interaction with the mountainous terrain of the Philippines. On the morning of November 24, Irma moved ashore northeast of Manila, with winds of 165 km/h (105 mph). The storm rapidly deteriorated overland, but was still believed to have been a typhoon when it emerged into the South China Sea. Irma then began to re-curve towards the northwest while weakening; the cyclone was estimated to have obtained extratropical characteristics on November 26.

Affecting an area already severely impacted by Typhoon Hazen, Irma brought significant damage and flooding to the Philippines, especially in the province of Camarines Norte. Additionally, a 15 m (50 ft) tidal wave was noted in four towns in the Camarines Sur province, resulting in the deaths of 137 people. The nearby village of Benagaspasan was nearly demolished, where 47 fatalities occurred. In all, 595 were killed due to Irma. A total of 482,678 persons were directly affected by Irma. Irma destroyed or damaged 119,233 dwellings, which left nearly 40,000 homeless. A total of 24,137 families or 141,974 individuals left their homes, including 57,198 that sought emergency shelter. Overall, damage totaled to $63.3 million (1981 USD). (Note: All currencies are converted to United States Dollars using Philippines Measuring worth with an exchange rate of the year 1981.)

== Meteorological history ==
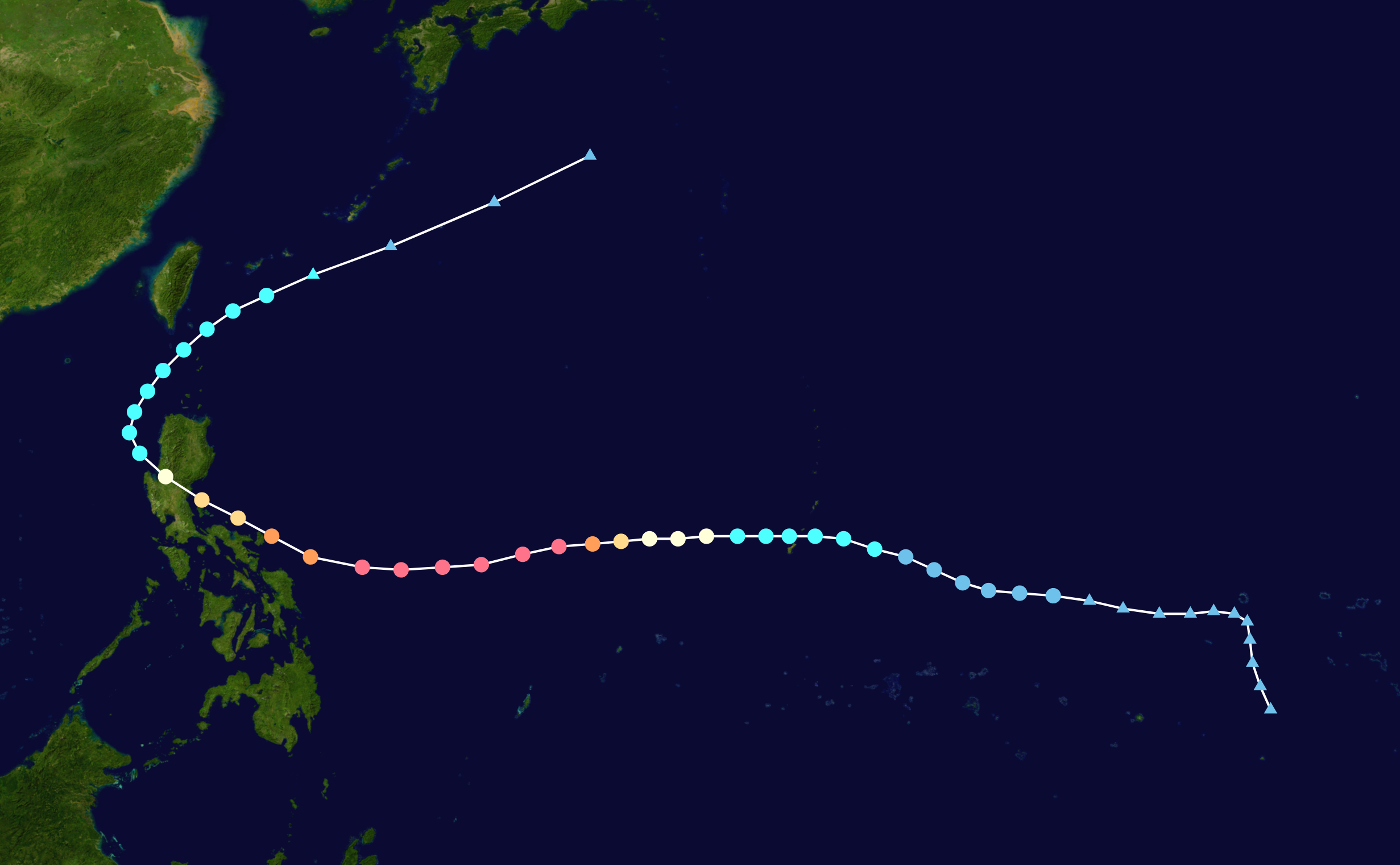
Map plotting the storm's track and intensity, according to the Saffir–Simpson scale Map key Saffir–Simpson scale Tropical depression (≤38 mph, ≤62 km/h) Tropical storm (39–73 mph, 63–118 km/h) Category 1 (74–95 mph, 119–153 km/h) Category 2 (96–110 mph, 154–177 km/h) Category 3 (111–129 mph, 178–208 km/h) Category 4 (130–156 mph, 209–251 km/h) Category 5 (≥157 mph, ≥252 km/h) Unknown Storm type Tropical cyclone Subtropical cyclone Extratropical cyclone, remnant low, tropical disturbance, or monsoon depression

Typhoon Irma originated from an active monsoon within the vicinity of Micronesia. The second of three storms to form within this region in mid-November 1981, the cyclone was first noted on November 10 as a "zone of strong convection activity". Although the zone was well-organized, there was initially little to no evidence of a low-level circulation. However, a weak circulation was detected on a few days later, and on November 15, the system was situated to the east of Ponape as satellite imagery indicated that convection was developing. During the next three days, thunderstorm activity waxed and waned as the disturbance moved north and then west. During this time, the disturbance was located 1,100 km (685 mi) east of Typhoon Hazen. By November 18, shower activity had improved in both coverage and organization. That afternoon, the Joint Typhoon Warning Center (JTWC) issued a Tropical Cyclone Formation Alert (TCFA) for the disturbance. Within two hours, the Japan Meteorological Agency (JMA) began to track the system. (Note: The Japan Meteorological Agency is the official Regional Specialized Meteorological Center for the western Pacific Ocean.)

On the morning of November 19, a Hurricane Hunter aircraft reported winds of 55 km/h (35 mph), prompting the JTWC to classify the system as a tropical depression. After passing north of Guam, Irma was upgraded into a tropical storm by both agencies. (Note: Wind estimates from the JMA and most other basins throughout the world are sustained over 10 minutes, while estimates from the United States-based Joint Typhoon Warning Center are sustained over 1 minute. 10 minute winds are about 1.14 times the amount of 1 minute winds.) Around this time, the JTWC expected that Irma would pass south of a front and then turn southwest. Tropical Storm Irma began to deepen more rapidly, and on November 20, the JMA upgraded Irma into a severe tropical storm. Thereafter, Irma turned west as a subtropical ridge built north and northwest of the storm, which protected Irma from feeling the effects of strong wind shear. At 1800 UTC on November 20, the JTWC upgraded Irma into a typhoon. Later that evening, a Hurricane Hunter aircraft reported winds of 160 km/h (100 mph) and a pressure of 968 mbar (28.6 inHg). Following the formation of a 74 km (46 mi) eye, the JMA declared that Irma attained typhoon status at 0000 UTC on November 21; subsequently, the system passed south of a second cold front. By 0900 UTC that day, rapid deepening to pressures below 925 mbar (27.3 inHg) was anticipated by the JTWC. At 1800 UTC on November 21, the JMA raised the intensity of the typhoon to 175 km/h (110 mph) while the JTWC reported that Irma reached winds of 200 km/h (125 mph), equivalent to a Category 3 hurricane on the United States-based Saffir-Simpson Hurricane Wind Scale (SSHWS). Midday on November 22, a Hurricane Hunter airplane reported a pressure of 905 mbar (25 inHg). Based on this the JTWC upgraded Irma into a super typhoon. Meanwhile, data from both the JTWC and JMA suggested that Irma reached its peak intensity, with the former reporting winds of 250 km/h (155 mph) and the latter reporting winds of 200 km/h (125 mph). On that day, the Philippine Atmospheric, Geophysical and Astronomical Services Administration (PAGASA) also started to monitor the storm and assigned it with the local name Anding.

Irma maintained super typhoon intensity for 16 hours before gradually weakening due to the storm's close proximity to the mountainous terrain of the Philippines. After turning northwest towards a break within the subtropical ridge, Irma moved ashore around 0900 UTC on November 24, roughly 100 km (60 mi) northeast of Manila. At the time of landfall, both agencies estimated winds of 160 km/h (100 mph), equal to Category 2 intensity on the SSHWS. Although the JTWC downgraded Irma to a tropical storm that afternoon just before entering Lingayen Gulf and the South China Sea, the JMA maintained Irma at typhoon intensity throughout the storm's passage of the Philippines. Ten hours later, a Hurricane Hunter aircraft investigated Irma and noted that Irma was poorly organized, with most of the convection sheared off to the north of the center. Influenced by a trough east of Asia, Irma began to re-curve into the Luzon Straits on November 25. Around this time, the JMA downgraded Irma into a severe tropical storm. Early on November 26, the JMA reported that Irma had transitioned into an extratropical cyclone. About 24 hours later, Irma merged with a cold front in the Ryukyu Islands. On the evening of November 27, both PAGASA and the JMA ceased monitoring Irma.

== Preparations and impact ==
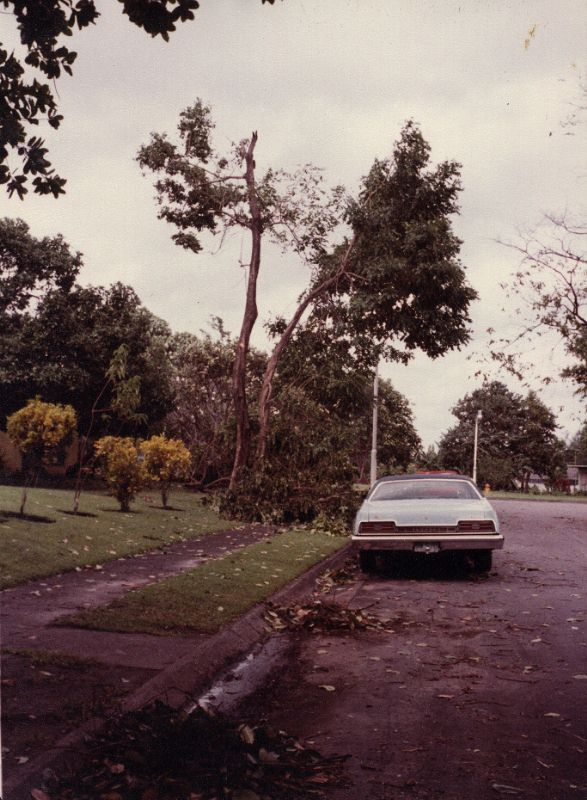
Wind damage from Typhoon Irma

=== Philippines ===
A few days prior to Irma's passage, the Philippines archipelago was affected by Typhoon Hazen, which left 2,000 homeless. As Irma neared landfall, radio and television authorities warned residents to take precautions. Relief agencies were placed on standby. Schools were closed. Much of the Philippines, including the capital city of Manila, was placed on typhoon alert.

After striking the Philippines, the storm caused widespread damage while becoming the strongest storm to affect the archipelago since 1970. The hardest hit was the province of Camarines Norte along the eastern portion of the island of Luzon.

A 15 m (50 ft) tidal wave swamped the towns of Garchitorena, Serona, Lagonoy and Caramoan in the Camarines Sur province, situated roughly 230 km (145 mi) southeast of Manila. Throughout the aforementioned four towns, 137 people were killed. Virtually every house was demolished due to storm surge in Benagaspasan, a small town with a population 1,000. A total of 47 killed in the village. Thirty-seven were injured in Bengaspasan as well. Fourteen survivors sought refuge in a health center 46 m (150 ft) from the shore. In Caramoan, only one of 2,000 homes remained standing; 38 persons were killed. Elsewhere, in Garchitorena, a town with 20,000 residents, 117 people perished and only the mayor's house was left standing. The communities of Serona and Lagonoy also suffered heavy damage.

Across much of Luzon, Irma flattened houses and flooding streets, resulting in considerable damage. Irma brought down power lines, which led to blackouts along the suburbs of Manila. One army officer died via electrocution while trying to fix the roof of his dwelling in Makati. Many other deaths occurred when they were crushed to death under collapsed houses or killed by flying debris. For instance, two people died when their house on Mindoro Island collapsed and a farmer in Quezon died after being hit by a falling coconut. Elsewhere on Midoro Island, 60 homes were destroyed. Offshore, eighteen fisherman were listed as missing. Twenty-six of the casualties happened in Manila while 12 others died in the rural town of Daet along the southern part of Luzon due to flooding and falling debris. Due to the storm, iron sheets were littered across the slums of Manila. Communication lines between Daet and Manila were disconnected; many villages between the two location were destroyed. In Lucena, two people were killed and many coconuts were tossed from trees. In Bulacan, civil defense officials advised thousands of inhabitants on the banks of the Angat River to flee as water along the river threatened to overflow their banks. In the Rizal province, one agency reported that it dispatched several army trucks to fetch roughly 2,000 stranded 12- to 15-year-old boy scouts. In a nearby park, the typhoon blew down houses, power poles, billboards and trees. Even though the Clark Air Base and Subic Bay, both United States-run, sustained little damage, six C-130 transports had to be evacuated to the Kadena Air Base in Okinawa and ships, including the aircraft carrier Constellation. Philippine President Ferdinand E. Marcos ordered the closure of all government offices in affected areas, which included the capital city of Manila. Additionally, many private offices sent their employees home.

A total of 482,678 individuals were directly affected by the storm. According to press reports, 12,076 families in six provinces lost their homes. Nearly 40,000 persons were rendered as homeless. In all, Typhoon Irma destroyed or damaged 119,233 houses. A total of 24,137 families or 141,974 persons left their homes, 57,198 of which fled to evacuation centers because of flash flooding. The aforementioned evacuation camps included schools, town halls, and churches. Overall, damage totaled to $63.3 million, including $41.8 million from infrastructure. (Note: All currencies are converted to United States Dollars using Philippines Measuring worth with an exchange rate of the year 1981.) Crop damage was minimal, estimated at $10 million. Furthermore, 595 people were killed because of Irma. Seventy-two others were wounded.

=== Elsewhere ===
Officials issued a tropical storm warning for Guam when Irma formed on November 17. Winds of 56 km/h (35 mph) were measured in addition to 81 km/h (50 mph) gusts. However, no major damage was reported. The decaying remnants of Irma then brought 105 to 150 mm (5 to 5 in) of rain and winds of up to 72 km/h (45 mph) to Okinawa.

== Aftermath ==
Following Irma, many survivors in Benagaspasan demanded for an emergency airlift of food, medicine, and clothing. These were expected to be provided by air force authorities. Provençal governments asked the president to declare Camarines Norte and Camarines Sur provinces disaster areas. Marcos also toured over the devastated area, noting that damage was less than initially feared. On December 1, President Marcos declared a state of emergency in 17 Philippines provinces. Following a meeting, Marcos ordered the release of $278,750 to help subsidize rice to farmers. Moreover, $250,000 was ordered to be released for other relief operations.

== See also ==
- Other tropical cyclones named Irma
- Typhoon Lee (1981)
- Typhoon Haiyan (2013)
- Typhoon Fung-wong (2025)
