= Typhoon Dot (1964) =

Pacific typhoon in 1964

Typhoon Dot (Enang)
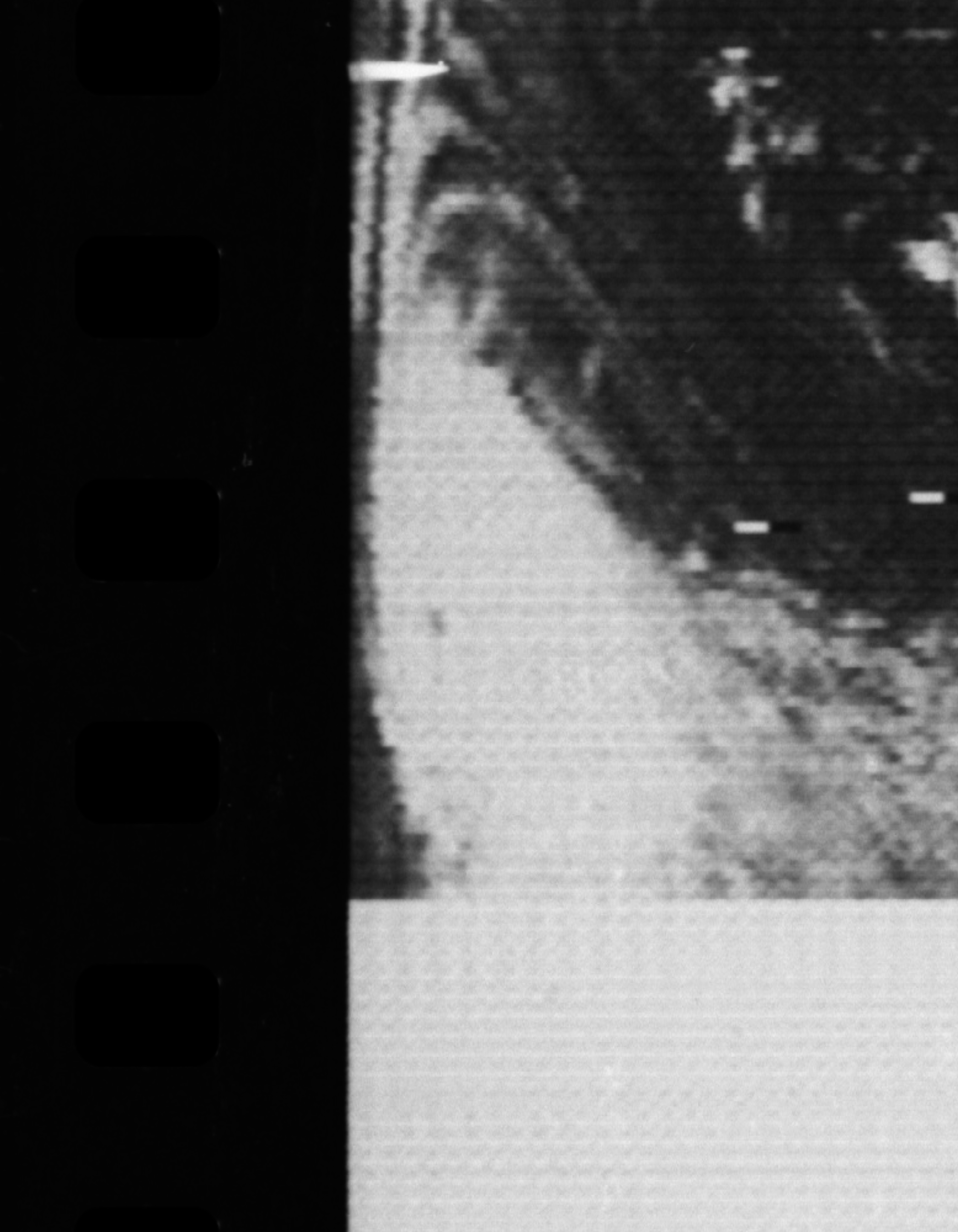
- Nimbus 1 satellite imagery of the typhoon at peak intensity on October 12

Meteorological history
- Formed: October 3, 1964
- Dissipated: October 19, 1964

Typhoon
- 10-minute sustained (JMA)
- Highest winds: 150 km/h (90 mph)
- Lowest pressure: 980 hPa (mbar); 28.94 inHg

Category 2-equivalent typhoon
- 1-minute sustained (SSHWS/JTWC)
- Highest winds: 165 km/h (105 mph)

Overall effects
- Fatalities: ≤26
- Missing: 10
- Areas affected: China, Hong Kong, Palau, Philippines
- Part of the 1964 Pacific typhoon season

Typhoon Dot (known as Typhoon Enang in the Philippines) was a strong tropical cyclone that made landfalls on Luzon and near Hong Kong in October 1964. It was the fifth typhoon to impact Hong Kong during the active 1964 Pacific typhoon season, and prompted the issuance of the No. 10 typhoon signal from the Royal Observatory in Hong Kong—the highest warning possible. The storm's precursor disturbance formed west of Pohnpei on October 3 and tracked towards the west, becoming a tropical storm by October 6. Gradually strengthening, Dot moved towards the west-northwest, northwest, and then curved west, leading to a landfall at typhoon intensity on Luzon on October 9. A freighter with 32 crewmembers went missing west of the island after passing through the typhoon and was never recovered.

Dot tracked slowly and strengthened further across the South China Sea between October 9–13. The Royal Observatory began issuing tropical cyclone signals on October 10. A day later, Dot reached its peak intensity with one-minute sustained winds of around 165 km/h (103 mph) and ten-minute sustained winds of about 150 km/h (93 mph). Dot curved northward and maintained this intensity as its final landfall near Hong Kong on October 13, during which the Royal Observatory hoisted the No. 10 typhoon signal. Dot's slow movement near landfall prolonged its impacts, with the Royal Observatory recording eight hours of gale-force winds and over 330 mm (13 in) of rain. A peak gust of 220 km/h (140 mph) was clocked at Tate's Cairn, and the strong winds damaged most buildings around Hong Kong and shattered windows. Rain-triggered landslides destroyed homes and blocked roads. In total, Dot killed at least 26 people and injured 85 others according to the Royal Observatory, in addition to causing millions of U.S. dollars in property damage.

== Meteorological history ==
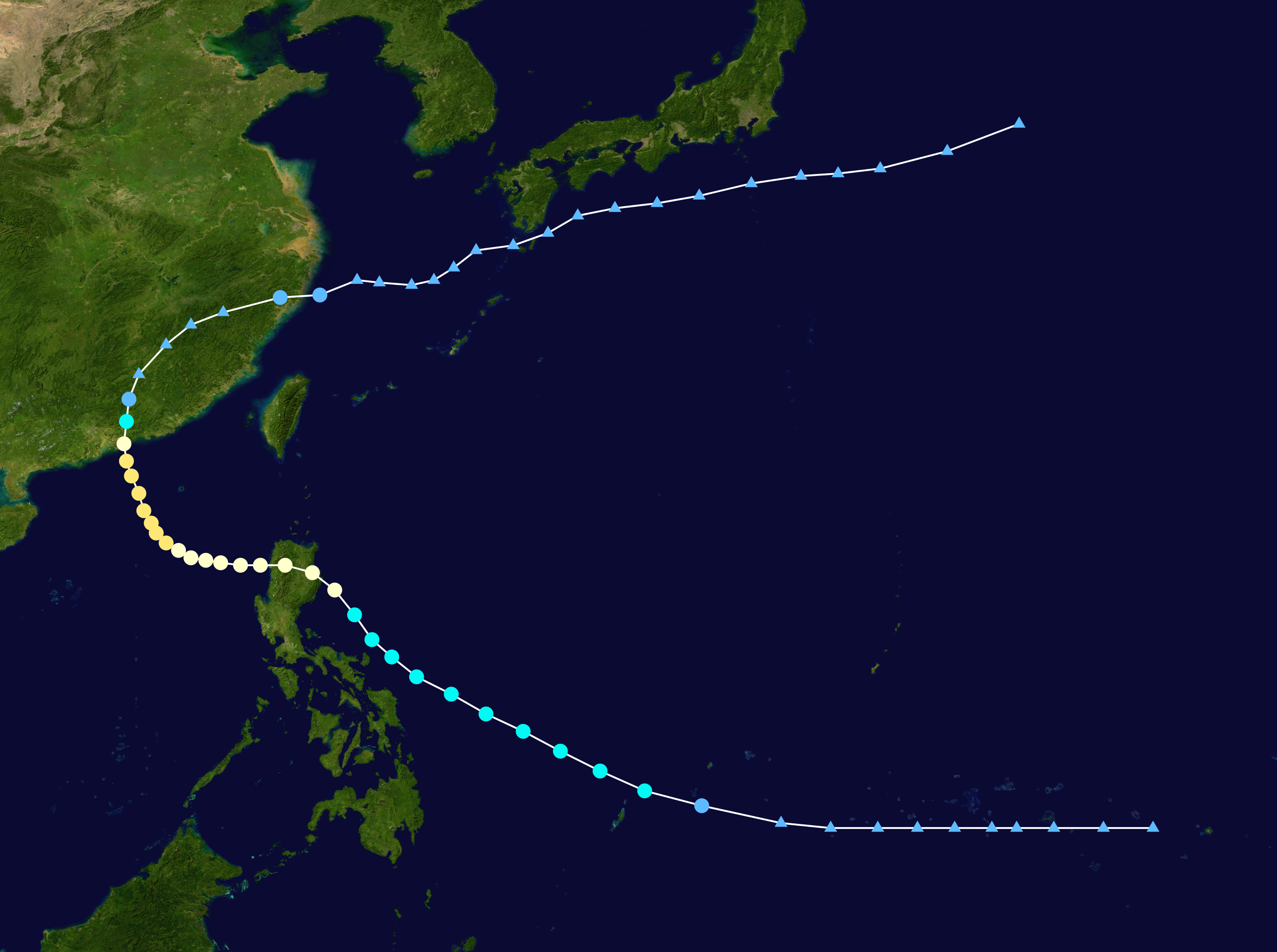
Map plotting the storm's track and intensity, according to the Saffir–Simpson scale Map key Saffir–Simpson scale Tropical depression (≤38 mph, ≤62 km/h) Tropical storm (39–73 mph, 63–118 km/h) Category 1 (74–95 mph, 119–153 km/h) Category 2 (96–110 mph, 154–177 km/h) Category 3 (111–129 mph, 178–208 km/h) Category 4 (130–156 mph, 209–251 km/h) Category 5 (≥157 mph, ≥252 km/h) Unknown Storm type Tropical cyclone Subtropical cyclone Extratropical cyclone, remnant low, tropical disturbance, or monsoon depression

Dot was the strongest tropical cyclone within the western Pacific basin in October 1964. According to data from the China Meteorological Administration (CMA), the precursor to Dot developed west of Pohnpei on October 3. The interaction of a trough of low-pressure and a tropical wave spurred tropical cyclogenesis. This initial disturbance tracked westward for several days; aircraft reconnaissance first intercepted the nascent system 160 km (99 mi) southwest of Yap, finding it to have organized into a tropical storm. Early airborne observations suggested the system was dissipating, but additional intercepts a more organized center of circulation on October 7 around which Dot was developing. Moving west-northwest, Dot passed offshore Catanduanes on October 8. That day, aircraft reconnaissance made their first detection of an eye within the tropical cyclone. Dot curved northwest and then west on October 9, concurrently reaching typhoon intensity and making landfall on northern Luzon at around 06:00 UTC the same day. Upon landfall, Dot's one-minute maximum sustained winds were estimated at 120 km/h (75 mph) according to the Joint Typhoon Warning Center (JTWC).

Dot crossed northern Luzon and emerged into the South China Sea on a westerly heading at Laoag as it maintained typhoon intensity. Between October 10–11, the typhoon curved towards the northwest and strengthened further. Dot nearly became stationary during the course of this turn approximately 430 km (270 mi) southwest of Hong Kong, but resumed a north-northwestward heading with a forward speed of about 11 km/h (6.8 mph) the next day. The JTWC estimated that Dot's one-minute sustained winds crested at 165 km/h (103 mph) on October 11, while the Royal Observatory estimated that Dot's ten-minute sustained winds peaked at 150 km/h (93 mph). The typhoon's central barometric pressure was estimated at 980 hPa (mbar; 28.94 inHg) by the Japan Meteorological Agency and 975 hPa (mbar; 28.79 inHg) by the HKO. Dot made landfall on China near Hong Kong holding roughly the same intensity at around 00:00 UTC on October 13. The HKO registered a minimum air pressure of 977 hPa (mbar; 28.85 inHg) as the center of Dot passed 30 km (19 mi) to the east; the typhoon's eye measured 80 km (50 mi) across. Once over land, the storm's winds diminished quickly, and by October 14, the JTWC considered Dot to have dissipated. However, data from the JMA indicates that Dot continued as a tropical storm northwards over China until October 15, after which the storm transitioned into an extratropical cyclone; this phase of Dot's existence continued east-northeast over the East China Sea and to the open Pacific east of Japan until they were last noted on October 19.

== Preparations and impact ==
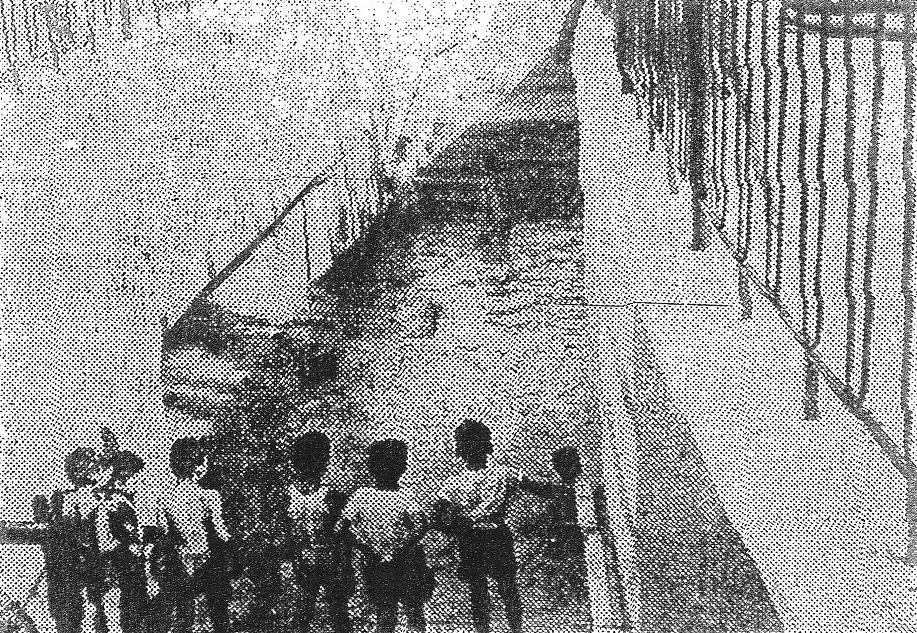
Damage from Dot in Hong Kong

The Panamanian freighter Juno with 32 crewmembers was lost following its final transmission on October 10 210 km (130 mi) west of Luzon after having just passed Typhoon Dot; search and rescue operations carried out by the Philippines and the U.S. were unable to locate the lost vessel. The Royal Observatory issued their first warning signal for Dot at 11:15 a.m. HKT (03:15 UTC) on October 10. The agency escalated these warnings as the storm neared, culminating in the raising of the No. 10 signal—the HKO's highest warning—on October 13 while the center of the storm lay 65 km (40 mi) away. Dot was the sixth storm since 1946 to trigger the No. 10 signal and the second in 1964, with the other being Typhoon Ruby. The Observatory deescalated warnings as the storm's effects lessened following landfall, with their last warning signal lowered after 6:25 p.m. HKT (12:25 UTC) on October 13, ending over 79 hours of active warnings from the Observatory. The typhoon's arrival led to the closure of many banks and offices and the suspension of all public transportation, including ferry service connecting Hong Kong Island and Kowloon. Flights to Hong Kong were suspended, with some overflying the colony to divert to Tokyo.

Dot was the fifth typhoon in 1964 to pass near Hong Kong and the third to do so within a month. Offshore the Crown colony, a ship reported sustained winds of 106 km/h (66 mph) and 5.1-meter (17-foot) seas. A peak gust of 220 km/h (140 mph) was measured at Tate's Cairn, with a peak hourly sustained wind of 157 km/h (98 mph). The HKO documented gale-force winds for eight hours at their headquarters as Dot made landfall, punctuated by a maximum wind gust of 174 km/h (108 mph). Dot's rough surf detached ships from their moorings, driving two ships aground at Victoria Harbour and causing the loss of 30 junks. Ninety fishing boats in total were lost. In the Hong Kong area, the most impacted locales including Sha Tin and Shau Kei Wan. The typhoon's winds and rain damaged most buildings, brought down power lines, and blew out thousands of glass windows, causing many injuries. Steel supports for signage and other structures were bent and broken by the strong wind. Dot produced a peak rainfall total of 331.2 mm (13.04 in), ranking it among the wettest tropical cyclones in Hong Kong's history; much of this rain fell within a 24-hour period. Torrential rainfall from the typhoon set off landslides blocked roads and destroyed homes, burying at least 20 people. Collapsing homes led to most of the casualties associated with Dot. The floods forced thousands of people to seek shelter at public buildings, while hundreds of others were evacuated to higher ground. According to the Royal Observatory's figures, Dot's effects killed 26 people and injured 85 others; another 10 people were never accounted for. However, rescue officials at the time confirmed a death toll of at least 34 according to the Associated Press. Most of the fatalities and missing were refugees from the People's Republic of China. A dam failure caused by the storm killed several people at a refugee settlement. Total property damage was estimated to be "in the millions of [U.S.] dollars". Heavy rains from Dot continued into Guangdong where they interfered with relief efforts concerning of a thousand homeless people.

== See also ==
- Typhoon Rose (1971)
- Typhoon Gloria (1957)
- Tropical Storm Utor (2001)
- Other tropical cyclones named Dot
