= List of named storms (D) =

Storms are named for historical reasons to avoid confusion when communicating with the public, as more than one storm can exist at a time. Names are drawn in order from predetermined lists. For tropical cyclones, names are assigned when a system has one-, three-, or ten-minute winds of more than 65 km/h (40 mph). Standards, however, vary from basin to basin. For example, some tropical depressions are named in the Western Pacific, while within the Australian and Southern Pacific regions, the naming of tropical cyclones are delayed until they have gale-force winds occurring more than halfway around the storm center.

This list covers the letter D.

== Storms ==
Note: † indicates the name was retired after that usage in the respective basin

- Dadafy (1982) – passed about east of Mauritius, and it subsequently weakened.
- Dadang

- 1971 – a system which made landfall in Luzon twice in October after executing a loop.
- 1983 – a tropical depression that formed off the coast of the Philippines.

- Dading (1964)† – a Category 3 typhoon that made landfall in the Philippines, Hainan and Vietnam.
- Daisy

- 1958 – Category 4 hurricane that did not affect land.
- 1962 (January) – struck Madagascar.
- 1962 (September) – damage over $1.1 million (1962 USD) in New England and the Canadian Maritimes.
- 1965 – re-designated from Cyclone Carol upon crossing from the Australian region.
- 1972† – caused some flooding near Brisbane.
- 1994 – struck Madagascar.

- Dalila

- 1995 – did not make landfall.
- 2001 – passed directly over Socorro Island as a tropical storm.
- 2007 – passed over Socorro Island.
- 2013 – made some impact on the western shore of Mexico and then shifted westward out to sea.
- 2019 – never threatened land.
- 2025 – affected southwestern Mexico

- Dalilia

- 1983 – never affected land.
- 1989 – passed just south of the Hawaiian Islands.

- Daling

- 1965 – a tropical storm which did not last long.
- 1965 – a tropical depression which was only tracked by the Philippine Weather Bureau.
- 1973 – a typhoon that affected the Ryukyu Islands and South Korea.
- 1977 – a short-lived tropical depression that hit South China.
- 1981 – a deadly severe tropical storm that caused widespread damage in the Bicol region of the Philippines.
- 1985 – a relatively strong typhoon which severely impacted the Philippines despite staying offshore, before eventually making landfall in Japan.
- 1989 – a fairly strong early-season storm that affected Japan.
- 1993 – a weak system that hit Southern Mindanao and dissipated at Sulu Sea shortly thereafter.
- 1997 – a typhoon which paralleled the Philippine coast before making landfall in Japan.

- Daman

- 1981 – a Category 2 tropical cyclone that not made landfall.
- 1992 – a Category 3 severe tropical cyclone that minimal affected the Vanuatu and New Caledonia.
- 2007† – a Category 4 severe tropical cyclone brushed by the Fijian island of Cikobia-i-Lau, causing damage to housing, crops and vegetation.

- Damia (1982) – a powerful tropical cyclone not areas land.
- Damien

- 1987 – a clCategory 2 tropical cyclone near Western Australia.
- 1999 – a Category 3 severe tropical cyclone, mostly stayed at sea.
- 2020† – was the strongest cyclone to make landfall in the Western Australian coast since Cyclone Christine.

- Damienne (2000) – a weak tropical cyclone that reached the coast of Madagascar after the breakup of the circulation.
- Damrey

- 2000 – first name used from the WMO and strongest storm in 2000.
- 2005 – most powerful storm to affect Hainan in over 30 years.
- 2012 – the strongest to affect the area north of the Yangtze River since 1949.
- 2017 – a strong tropical cyclone that affected the Philippines and Vietnam during early November 2017.
- 2023 – skirted the eastern coast of Japan.

- Dan

- 1980 – did not affect land.
- 1989 – the third of a series of tropical cyclones that impacted the Philippines and Vietnam in October 1989.
- 1992 – came nowhere near land.
- 1995 – did not affect land.
- 1996 – did not affect land.
- 1999 – the worst typhoon to hit Xiamen in 46 years, killing five and injuring over 100 in the city.

- Dana (2024) – a tropical cyclone which affected the states of West Bengal and Odisha in India.
- Danae (1976) – struck Madagascar and then hit the east coast of Mozambique and South Africa in late January 1976.
- Danas

- 2001 – struck Japan.
- 2007 – high waves injured two people in Japan
- 2013 – Category 4 typhoon, which struck the Ryukyu Islands and Japan
- 2019 – the fifth named tropical cyclone of the 2019 Pacific typhoon season.
- 2025 – a rapidly intensified typhoon that struck Chiayi County, Taiwan as a Typhoon and Zhejiang, China.

- Dando (2012) – a subtropical cyclone that impacted Madagascar and Mozambique.
- Dani (1999)† – a Category 4 tropical cyclone that made landfall Vanuatu, its outer bands brought catastrophic rainfall to the Fiji, killing 12 people and leaving US$3.5 million in damage behind.
- Daniel

- 1978 – a Category 3 hurricane that did not affect land.
- 1982 – a Category 3 which reached Hawaii as a tropical depression and dissipated in the Alenuihaha Channel between Maui and the Big Island.
- 1988 – did not make landfall.
- 1994 – no reports of damage or casualties.
- 2000 – a Category 3 hurricane that threatened Hawaii for a time while weakening.
- 2006 – a powerful Category 4 hurricane that brought rain to Hawaii as a tropical depression.
- 2012 – a Category 3 hurricane that did not affect land.
- 2018 – a weak tropical storm that never threatened land.
- 2023 – a European windstorm and later medicane which severely affected Greece and caused catastrophic damage in Libya due to multiple dam failures, leaving over 4,000 people confirmed dead and more than 8,000 missing.
- 2024 – a weak tropical storm that stayed at sea.

- Daniella (1996) – a powerful Category 4 tropical cyclone that passed near Mauritius.
- Danielle

- 1964 – crossed between Réunion and Mauritius, producing wind gusts of 219 km/h (136 mph) in the latter island.
- 1980 – flooded the area of Beaumont-Port Arthur, Texas.
- 1986 – caused light damage to the Windward Islands.
- 1992 – caused light damage when it hit the Delmarva Peninsula.
- 1998 – a long-lived storm that caused damage in the United Kingdom as an extratropical storm.
- 2004 – churned in the eastern Atlantic Ocean and did not threaten land.
- 2010 – a long-lived storm that existed over the open Atlantic and did not cause damage to land.
- 2016 – earliest fourth-storm formation in the Atlantic Ocean since record-keeping began; made landfall in Veracruz, Mexico.
- 2022 – a Category 1 hurricane that churned over the central Atlantic.

- Danilo (2020) – a strong tropical storm, never threatened land.
- Danitza (1979) – did not make landfall.
- Danny

- 1985 – caused widespread flooding in Louisiana, killing 3 and causing $12 million in damage.
- 1991 – formed near Cape Verde islands but dissipated before threatening land.
- 1997 – struck Louisiana and Alabama; tracked across the southeastern United States and ultimately affected parts of New England with rain and wind; killed nine and caused $100 million in damage (1997 USD).
- 2003 – looped in open ocean, never threatened land.
- 2009 – formed as a tropical storm east of the Bahamas, skipping depression status; later absorbed by a frontal system off the US east coast.
- 2015 – a small category 3 hurricane that approached the Leeward Islands but dissipated before threatening land.
- 2021 – formed shortly before making landfall in South Carolina.

- Dante

- 2005 – approached Japan.
- 2009 – triggered severe flooding and mudslides which killed 28 people on Luzon.
- 2013 – impacted the Philippines and Japan.
- 2017 – did not affect land.
- 2021 – crossed the Philippines and later affected Taiwan.
- 2025 – minimal tropical storm that passed through the Ryukyu Islands before making landfall in China.

- Dany (1969) – caused 80 deaths in Madagascar, and 2 in Réunion.
- Daodo (1987) – did not make landfall.
- Daphne

- 1966 – a powerful tropical storm, affected Madagascar and Mozambique.
- 1982† – a Category 2 tropical cyclone that hit Australia.
- 1991 – then crossed Australia to Indian Ocean.
- 2012 – did not affect land.

- Darby

- 1980 – did not affect land.
- 1986 – remained at sea.
- 1992 – a Category 3 hurricane, remained well offshore but caused minor damage in Mexico and California.
- 1998 – a Category 3 hurricane, never affected land.
- 2004 – a Category 3 hurricane, remnants affected the Hawaiian Islands.
- 2010 – a Category 3 hurricane, dissipated off the coast of southern Mexico.
- 2016 – a Category 3 hurricane, made landfall on the Island of Hawaii as a tropical storm.
- 2022 – a Category 4 hurricane, churned in the open ocean and dissipated south of the Island of Hawaii.

- Darian (2022) – a severe Category 5 Australian scale tropical cyclone remained mostly offshore.
- Daryl

- 1984 – a Category 4 severe tropical cyclone, never affected land.
- 1995 – remained in the open ocean.
- 2006 – a Category 2 tropical cyclone tracked parallel to the West Australian coast.

- David

- 1976† – a Category 3 severe tropical cyclone that made landfall in Queensland.
- 1979† – a Category 5 hurricane that made landfall in the Dominican Republic and later in both Florida and Georgia, causing over 2,000 deaths people along its path.
- 1997 – a Category 2 typhoon that remained over the open ocean.
- 2009 – whose remnants brought heavy rain to the islands of Mauritius and Réunion.

- Davilia (1992) – did not make landfall.
- Davina (1999) – a powerful tropical cyclone category 3 affected Mauritius.
- Dawn

- 1970 – a Category 2 tropical cyclone that affected the Far North Queensland and New Caledonia with heavy rain.
- 1972 – a Category 1 hurricane that affected The Bahamas and East Coast of the United States.
- 1976 – a Category 2 tropical cyclone that affected Eastern states of Australia.
- 1998 – a weak tropical cyclone that caused 187 deaths in Vietnam, and was described as the worst storm to hit the region in 3 decades.

- Daye (2018) – a weak tropical cyclone that affected the states of Odisha and Andhra Pradesh.
- Dean

- 1980 – which struck Western Australia and caused substantial damage to Port Hedland.
- 1983 – which struck the coast of Virginia, causing minor erosion and flooding.
- 1989 – which passed over Bermuda, causing $10 million in damage and 16 injuries.
- 1995 – which caused significant flooding damage to Chambers County, Texas, but 1 death.
- 2001 – which caused $7.7 million in damage to Puerto Rico and minimal damage to the U.S. Virgin Islands.
- 2007† – a Cape Verde hurricane that made landfall in the Yucatan Peninsula at Category 5 strength.

- Deanna

- 1992 – a weak tropical storm that did not affect land.
- 1995 – a weak tropical storm that made landfall Philippines and Taiwan.

- Debbie

- 1957 – a tropical storm that affected Florida.
- 1961 – a Category 1 hurricane that hit Ireland as an extratropical storm.
- 1965 – crossed the northeastern Yucatán Peninsula as a depression and dissipated offshore from Mississippi.
- 1969 –a Category 3 major hurricane that brushing Newfoundland.
- 2003 – Category 3 severe tropical cyclone that made landfall in the Northern Territory.
- 2017† – Category 4 severe tropical cyclone that made landfall in Queensland.

- Debby

- 1967 – did not make landfall.
- 1982 – reached Category 4 strength, grazed Bermuda, and caused high winds at Cape Race, but no significant damage.
- 1988 – reached hurricane strength just before landfall at Tuxpan, Mexico, killing ten, but remained a hurricane for only six hours and later became Tropical Depression 17-E in the Pacific.
- 1994 – formed near and passed over Saint Lucia, later dissipated over Hispañola; nine deaths were reported, and flooding and mudslides on Saint Lucia were severe.
- 2000 – was a disorganized storm that caused minor damage to the Leeward Islands and Puerto Rico, but actually helped relieve a severe Cuban drought.
- 2006 – formed south of Cape Verde and dissipated in the Central Atlantic.
- 2012 – formed near the Yucatán peninsula, made landfall in Florida and then became post-tropical near the Bahamas.
- 2018 – formed in the open waters of the North Atlantic, did not affect land.
- 2024 – Category 1 hurricane that impacted the East Coast of the United States.

- Deborah (1975) – a powerful tropical cyclone that passed near Réunion and hit Madagascar.
- Debra

- 1959 – a weak Category 1 hurricane that made its landfall in Texas.
- 1963 – a Category 1 hurricane that never affected land.
- 1978 – a short-lived tropical storm that caused minimal damages in Louisiana.
- 1991 – a powerful tropical storm affected Mozambique and South Africa.

- Deidre (1973) – a powerful tropical cyclone stayed sea.
- Delang

- 1974 – a late-season tropical storm that struck the Philippines.
- 1978 – made landfall on Luzon.
- 1994 – executed a loop before turning away from the Philippines.

- Delia

- 1963 – a powerful tropical cyclone minimal affected Madagascar and Reunion.
- 1973 – a strong tropical storm that made landfall in Texas.

- Delifina (1986) – did not make landfall.
- Delilah

- 1950 – a strong tropical storm affected Philippines.
- 1960 – a tropical cyclone existed to the west of Fiji.
- 1967 – did not make landfall.
- 1989† – a Category 2 tropical cyclone (Australian scale) that affected New Caledonia.

- Delinda (1973) – a powerful tropical cyclone stayed sea.
- Deliwe (2014) – a weak tropical storm that made landfall in the Madagascar and Mozambique.
- Deling

- 1966 – Southern Taiwan bore the brunt of Judy's impact; a U.S. Navy aircraft crashed in the storm
- 1970 – an intense typhoon that caused heavy damages in Japan and South Korea
- 1974 – a deadly and destructive typhoon that struck Japan and South Korea
- 1978 – hit Vietnam as a tropical storm
- 1982 – a short-lived storm east of Taiwan; considered a continuation of Tess by the Japan Meteorological Agency
- 1986 – a Category 1 typhoon that hit Taiwan then passed off the coast of China and South Korea
- 1990 – a long-living tropical storm that caused minor impacts in South Korea and the Russian Far East
- 1994 – a short-lived depression off the Paracel Islands
- 1998 – a Category 4 typhoon that stayed out at sea east of Japan, but brought heavy flooding to Honshu

- Della

- 1949 – A category 3 typhoon affected Japan and South Korea.
- 1952 – a powerful typhoon that made landfall Northern Philippines.
- 1960 – a strong typhoon affected Japan.
- 1968 – a typhoon that struck Miyakojima of Ryukyu Islands and Kyūshū Island in September 1968.
- 1971 – a category 2 typhoon that made landfall Philippines, South China and Vietnam.
- 1974 – a strong typhoon passed near the Philippines.
- 1978 – a weak tropical storm landed in Taiwan and China.

- Delphine (1969) – a weak tropical storm, affected Madagascar and Mozambique.
- Delta

- 1972 – formed and remained in the central Atlantic.
- 2005 – formed in the eastern Atlantic and became extratropical just before it passed to the north of the Canary Islands.
- 2020 – peaked as a powerful category 4 hurricane in the western Caribbean before making landfall as a category 2 hurricane in the Yucatán Peninsula and later in Louisiana.

- Deni (2016) – a South Atlantic subtropical cyclone that impacted Rio de Janeiro, Brazil.
- Denise

- 1966 – passed north of Mauritius and then crossed over Réunion.
- 1967 – weak tropical storm that never threatened land.
- 1971 – Category 4 hurricane that remained in the open ocean.
- 1975 – Category 4 hurricane that did not come near land.

- Dennis

- 1981 – a weak storm that made landfall in Cuba and then Florida, causing moderate damage.
- 1987 – remained in the open ocean.
- 1993 – never threatened land.
- 1996 – a Category 1 tropical cyclone that made landfall in Queensland.
- 1999 – a Category 2 hurricane that grazed the Bahamas and stalled east of Outer Banks of North Carolina before making landfall there.
- 2005† – a potent and damaging storm that made landfall in Cuba twice as a Category 4 hurricane and once in Florida as a Category 3.

- Des

- 1983 – a Category 1 tropical cyclone that made landfall Queensland as tropical depression.
- 2002 – a Category 1 tropical cyclone that minimal affected New Caledonia.

- Dessilia (1993) – a strong tropical storm affected Madagascar.
- Dety (1990) – did not make landfall.
- Dexter (2025) – remained in the open ocean.
- Diana

- 1960 – Category 1 hurricane, brushed southern Baja California Peninsula.
- 1968 – remained over the open ocean.
- 1972 – Category 2 hurricane, dissipated near the Hawaiian Islands.
- 1976 – Category 2 hurricane, never threatened land.
- 1978† – a Category 2 tropical cyclone (Australian scale) that affected islands in the South Pacific
- 1980 – did not make landfall.
- 1984 – Category 4 hurricane, struck North Carolina.
- 1990† – Category 2 hurricane, struck Yucatán and Veracruz, Mexico.

- Diane

- 1955† – a Category 2 hurricane that caused heavy damage to New England.
- 1960 – tropical storm that formed in the Mozambique Channel, after hitting Madagascar.
- 2020 – caused flooding in Madagascar.

- Dianmu

- 2004 – a powerful typhoon that struck southeastern Japan during the 2004.
- 2010 – made landfall on Japan; exiting the country within five hours heavy rains were reported throughout the islands.
- 2016 – a weak tropical cyclone that struck Leizhou Peninsula, China and Northern Vietnam in mid August 2016.
- 2021 – a weak tropical cyclone that caused considerable damage over parts of Mainland Southeast Asia during late-September 2021.

- Dianne

- 1946 – a strong Category 2 typhoon that did not affect land.
- 2002 – never threatened land.
- 2011 – a Category 3 tropical cyclone remained well offshore and was steered drifted towards the west-southwest by a ridge of high pressure while slowly developing further.
- 2025 – a Category 2 tropical cyclone that made landfall in Western Australia.

- Didang

- 1968 – a relatively strong tropical storm which erratically moved between Northern Luzon and Taiwan.
- 1972 – a weak system that was only tracked by the Philippine Weather Bureau.
- 1976 – a strong early-season typhoon which severely affected the Philippines and eventually also impacted Japan.

- Diding

- 1963 – a minimal typhoon that struck the Philippines and China.
- 1967 – an early-season tropical storm that stayed at sea.
- 1971 – a relatively strong typhoon which claimed dozens of lives in the Philippines and Vietnam.
- 1975 – a system which intensified from a tropical to a typhoon in a span of 30 hours, eventually striking East China.
- 1979 – a system which was considered by the Joint Typhoon Warning Center (JTWC) as a mere tropical depression.
- 1983 – a violent typhoon that only caused minimal damage in Japan and the Philippines.
- 1987 – a Category 1-equivalent severe tropical storm which passed northeast of the Philippines and skirted Taiwan.
- 1991 – a relatively strong typhoon that struck Luzon during the climactic eruption of Mount Pinatubo.
- 1995 – a short-lived tropical storm which made landfall on Leizhou Peninsula.
- 1999 – an early-season tropical storm that formed in east-central Philippines before heading out to sea.

- Dikeledi (2025) – a powerful tropical cyclone that affected Madagascar and Mozambique.
- Dinah

- 1952 – a tropical cyclone that brought heavy damages to Japan, while leaving 65 fatalities and 70 to be missing, all in that country alone.
- 1959 – a powerful category 5 typhoon that was moving towards the coast of Japan, later changing course before reaching the coast of the country.
- 1965 – a powerful Category 5 typhoon that destroyed 5,000 homes in Taiwan.
- 1967 (January)† – an intense tropical cyclone that impacted the southern coasts of Queensland and New South Wales, causing floods and landslides in 1967.
- 1967 (October) – struck the southern island of Kyūshū in Japan, killing thirty-seven people and resulting in ten others being reported as missing
- 1974 – hit Luzon on the 10th as an 80 mph typhoon it continued northwestward, hit Hainan Island, crossed the Gulf of Tonkin, and dissipated over North Vietnam.
- 1977 – brought heavy rain and flooding to Luzon that killed 54 people and left 11 others missing.
- 1984 – did not affect land.
- 1987 – the fourth typhoon to form during August 1987.

- Dinang

- 1981 – a destructive late-season typhoon which impacted the Philippines, killing at least 188 people.
- 1993 – the only Category 5 typhoon to exist during 1993; did not affect land areas.

- Dindo

- 2004 – a May storm that reached Category 5 intensity and approached the Bicol Region.
- 2008 – dud not make landfall.
- 2012 – Macau, the storm caused minor roof damage.
- 2016 – an erratic system that did many twists and turns in the open sea before hitting mainland Japan.
- 2020 – a storm that formed off the coast of Luzon in early August, and hit the People's Republic of China.
- 2024 – a weak tropical storm that affected Ryukyu Islands and the Korean peninsula.

- Dingani (2023) – never threatened land.
- Ditang

- 1980 – a strong and long-lived early-season typhoon which affected the Philippines.
- 1984 – a relatively strong tropical system which crossed Taiwan and Mainland China.
- 1988 – a minimal typhoon that paralleled the Philippine seaboard.
- 1992 – a strong tropical storm which brought destructive impacts to the Philippines and China, claiming 48 lives.
- 1996 – an early-season tropical storm that only caused minimal damages after brushing Taiwan, northern Philippines and the Ryukyu Islands.
- 2000 – a powerful typhoon which brushed eastern Japan as a weaker system.

- Ditra (1985) – passed just east of Rodrigues, bringing heavy rains.
- Ditwah (2025) – a deadly tropical cyclone that brought heavy rains to Sri Lanka and Southern India.
- Djoungou (2024) – a Category 4 tropical cyclone that churned over the open Indian Ocean.
- Doaza (1988) – struck eastern Madagascar near Île Sainte-Marie, and it quickly weakened over land.
- Dodong

- 2003 – approached Taiwan.
- 2007 – approached Taiwan.
- 2011 – a weak but costly tropical storm that affected Philippines and the East China in early-June 2011.
- 2015 – a Category 5 typhoon that affected the Philippines in May of 2015.
- 2019 – affected Japan and was not recognized by the JTWC.
- 2023 – a Category 2-equivalent typhoon (a Severe Tropical Storm, according to the JMA) that affected Philippines and Southern China, caused widespread rains over the country.

- Dog

- 1950 – Category 4 Cape Verde hurricane causing severe damage in the Leeward Islands.
- 1951 – Category 1 hurricane that made landfall in Saint Lucia.
- 1952 – Strong tropical storm that did not affect land.

- Doksuri

- 2012 – made landfall over Nanshui, Zhuhai, Guangdong, China.
- 2017 – traversed the Northern Philippines and made landfall in Central Vietnam.
- 2023† – a super typhoon that ravaged across Northern Philippines, Taiwan and Southern China, becoming the costliest typhoon to hit China and this basin.

- Dolly

- 1946 – made landfall in China's Zhejiang province.
- 1953 – Category 1 hurricane that hit Puerto Rico.
- 1954 – Category 1 hurricane that moved through the Atlantic, never affecting land.
- 1965 – never impacted land.
- 1968 – moved up the east coast of the United States but did not make landfall.
- 1970 – a Category 3 severe tropical cyclone that minimal affected Vanuatu.
- 1972 – developed off the coast of Madagascar that later grazed Réunion.
- 1974 – did not strike land.
- 1996 – made landfall at Quintana Roo, Mexico and again at Tamaulipas, Mexico.
- 2002 – never threatened land.
- 2008 – Category 2 hurricane that caused $1.5 billion in damage to Texas and Mexico.
- 2014 – made landfall in Mexico.
- 2020 – formed off the coast of the United States as a subtropical depression.
- 2026 – stayed weak into the ocean, never affected land.

- Dolores

- 1948 – storm that dissipated off the coast of Japan: also named Eunice after Dolores was thought to have dissipated operationally.
- 1966 – Category 1 hurricane that stayed out at sea.
- 1970 – operationally thought to have reached tropical storm strength.
- 1974 – made landfall in the vicinity of Acapulco.
- 1979 – Category 3 hurricane that stayed out at sea.
- 1985 – Category 3 hurricane that never affected land.
- 1991 – did not make landfall.
- 1997 – Category 1 hurricane that never affected land.
- 2003 – short-lived storm that never threatened land.
- 2009 – short-lived storm.
- 2015 – Category 4 hurricane that brought record-breaking rain to Southern California.
- 2021 – made landfall in Southwestern Mexico.

- Doloresse (1996) – heavy rainfall caused landslides, and the cyclone caused a shipwreck, killing 67 people on the island of Mohéli.
- Dolphin

- 2008 – Category 2 typhoon that did not affect land.
- 2015 — Category 5 super typhoon that churned though the open ocean.
- 2020 – paralleled the southeastern coast of Japan, remained well offshore.
- 2026 – a Category 5 super typhoon that affected the Ryukyu Islands, Taiwan and Eastern China.

- Dom

- 1980 – a Category 2 typhoon that brushed the Philippines.
- 1983 – a weak tropical storm that remained in the open ocean.
- 1986 – a weak tropical storm that made landfall in Vietnam caused heavy rainfall and flooding.

- Domeng

- 2006 – struck China.
- 2010 – passed through the Babuyan Islands.
- 2014 – did not make landfall.
- 2018 – did not make landfall.
- 2022 – threatening the Ryukyu Islands
- 2026 – a strong severe tropical storm that affected in the Japan.

- Dominic

- 1982† – a Category 5 tropical cyclone that made landfall near Cape Keerweer.
- 2009 – a Category 2 tropical cyclone that made landfall Western Australia.

- Dominique (1970) – a powerful tropical cyclone, stayed sea.
- Domitile (1977) – a weak tropical storm affected Madagascar.
- Domoina (1984) – in 1984 caused 100-year floods in South Africa and record rainfall in Swaziland.
- Don

- 2011 – weak tropical storm that made landfall on southern Texas.
- 2017 – short-lived tropical storm that dissipated before reaching the Windward Islands.
- 2023 – a Category 1 hurricane that remained in the open ocean.

- Dona (1989) – passing east of St. Brandon and later to the west of Rodrigues
- Donaline (1998) – a weak tropical storm not affected.
- Donna

- 1947 – a weak tropical storm that made landfall Japan.
- 1960† – was the strongest hurricane of the 1960 Atlantic hurricane season, and caused severe damage to the Lesser Antilles, the Greater Antilles, and the East Coast of the United States, especially Florida, in August–September.
- 2017† – was the strongest off-season tropical cyclone in the Southern Hemisphere during the month of May.

- Dora

- 1947 – a Category 4 typhoon, hit Philippines.
- 1956 – Tropical storm that caused 27 deaths in Mexico.
- 1964† – a Category 4 hurricane tha made landfall near St. Augustine, Florida, with winds of 110 mph (175 km/h).
- 1964 – hit Australia.
- 1971† – widespread structural damage was reported with power lines down and roofs removed.
- 1979 – a tropical depression affected Madagascar.
- 1981 – did not make landfall.
- 1987 – did not make landfall.
- 1993 – a powerful category 4 hurricane, did not make landfall.
- 1999 – long-lived hurricane in the Eastern, Central, and Western Pacific basins; did not affect land.
- 2005 – moved parallel to the Mexican coast near Acapulco.
- 2007 – a Category 4 tropical cyclone, did not make landfall.
- 2011 – moved parallel to the Mexican coast of Baja California Sur.
- 2017 – moved parallel to the Mexican coast.
- 2023† – long-lived Category 4 hurricane; crossed the International Dateline into the Western Pacific and was re-designated Typhoon Dora.

- Dorang

- 1964 – a Category 1 typhoon that made landfall Philippines and Vietnam.
- 1980 – a weak tropical storm that minimal affected Philippines.

- Doreen

- 1962 –a category 1 hurricane, made landfall Mexico.
- 1964 – tropical disturbance that hit Madagascar.
- 1965 – did not make landfall.
- 1969 – did not make landfall.
- 1973 – did not make landfall.
- 1977 – considered the worst tropical cyclone to affect California in 32 years. The tenth tropical cyclone, fourth named storm, and second hurricane of the otherwise inactive 1977.

- Doria

- 1967 – a Category 2 hurricane that looped offshore of the East Coast of the United States.
- 1971 – caused record-breaking precipitation in New Jersey.

- Dorian

- 2013 – a strong tropical storm that degenerated into an open wave in the middle of the ocean; it briefly reorganized into a tropical depression between the Bahamas and Florida.
- 2019† – a powerful and catastrophic Category 5 Atlantic hurricane, which became the worst natural disaster to strike the Bahamas.

- Dorina (1995) – a powerful tropical cyclone that slightly affected Port Mathurin.
- Doris

- 1945 –
- 1950 –
- 1953 –
- 1958 –
- 1961 – did not make landfall.
- 1964 –
- 1969 –
- 1975 –

- Dorothee (1973) – produced a series of thunderstorms on Réunion while the storm passed to the southwest.
- Dorothy

- 1966 - formed in July in the north Atlantic Ocean, remained away from land.
- 1970 - Deadliest tropical storm of the season, caused 51 deaths, mostly in Martinique, while moving through the Lesser Antilles.
- 1977 - formed near Bermuda and became extratropical near Newfoundland.

- Dot

- 1955 – a category 1 typhoon, make landfall Japan.
- 1959 – peaked as Category 4 hurricane prior to making landfall on Kauai, Hawaii.
- 1961 – affected Iwo Jima.
- 1964 – made landfall twice, affected the Philippines, Hong Kong and eastern China.
- 1966 – affected the Ryūkyū Islands.
- 1970 – formed northwest of Hawaii, peaked as a Category 1 hurricane; did not affect land.
- 1973 – made landfall just east of Hong Kong in mainland China.
- 1976 – scraped the coast of China near Shanghai before making landfall while dissipating on the Korean Peninsula.
- 1979 – affected most of The Philippines.
- 1983 – made landfall in China.
- 1985 – made landfall in the Philippines, brushed the southern coast of Hainan, made second landfall in Vietnam.
- 1989 – made landfall on Hainan, weakening before a third landfall in Vietnam.
- 1990 – made landfalls in Taiwan and China.
- 1993 – made landfall in the Philippines Turned away from Hainan at the last moment to make landfall on mainland China.

- Doug

- 1991 – a weak tropical depression, did not make landfall.
- 1994 – a Category 5 super typhoon that affected East China and Taiwan.

- Douglas

- 1984 – strongest hurricane of the season.
- 1990 – killed one person in Mexico, where it nearly made landfall.
- 1996 – was Hurricane Cesar in the Atlantic, crossed Central America and became Hurricane Douglas.
- 2002 – never threatened land.
- 2008 – passed near Mexico, brought minor flooding to some areas.
- 2014 – never threatened land.
- 2020 – passed very close to Hawaii at hurricane strength.
- 2026 – a weak tropical storm that never threatened land.

- Dovi

- 1988 – a Category 2 tropical cyclone that passed near Vanuatu.
- 2003 – a Category 5 severe tropical cyclone that affected the southern Cook Islands and Niue.
- 2022 – a Category 4 severe tropical cyclone that passed through New Caledonia.

- Doyle

- 1981 – a Category 1 typhoon, did not make landfall.
- 1984 – a Category 4 typhoon, did not make landfall.
- 1988 – a Category 4 typhoon, did not make landfall.

- Drena

- 1985 – a Category 1 tropical cyclone that did not make landfall.
- 1997† – a powerful tropical cyclone that caused significant damage throughout New Zealand.

- Dudzai (2026) – a Category 4 tropical cyclone that remained in the open ocean.
- Dujuan

- 2003 – hit near Hong Kong.
- 2008 – skirted the eastern coast of Japan.
- 2015 – A super typhoon which brought exceptionally strong winds to the Yaeyama Islands and Taiwan.
- 2021 – a weak tropical storm which brought heavy rains and flooding to the Philippines on mid-February.
- 2026 – a Category 1 typhoon passed near the coast of Japan.

- Dulcinee (1977) – did not make landfall.
- Dumako (2022) – a weak tropical cyclone that caused moderate damage in Madagascar.
- Durian

- 2001 – a deadly system that caused severe impacts in China and Vietnam.
- 2006† – a deadly tropical cyclone that wreaked havoc in the Philippines and later crossed the Malay Peninsula.

- Dylan (2014) – the first cyclone to hit the coast of Eastern Queensland since Yasi in 2011.

== See also ==
- Tropical cyclone
- Tropical cyclone naming
- European windstorm names
- Atlantic hurricane season
- List of Pacific hurricane seasons
- South Atlantic tropical cyclone
