= Hurricane Dan =

Hurricane Dan may refer to:

== People ==
- A nickname for Dan Rather, a journalist who often reported from the scene of landfalling hurricanes.

== Entertainment ==
- Hurricane Dan: A Zombie Novel, an audio book written by Bret Wellman and narrated by Jeff Johnson.

== See also ==
Set indexes of tropical cyclones with related names:

- Hurricane Daniel
- Hurricane Danielle
- Hurricane Danny
- Typhoon Dan
