= Denise =

Denise may refer to:

== People and fictional characters ==
- Denise (given name), a list of people and fictional characters with the given name
- Auguste Denise (1906–1990), the head of state of Ivory Coast before its independence
- Andrée Borrel (1919–1944), code name "Denise", French World War II member of the British Special Operations Executive

== Arts and entertainment ==
- "Denise" (Randy & the Rainbows song), 1963
- Denise (Fountains of Wayne song), 1999
- Denise (TV program), an Australian talk show (1998–2001)
- Denise, an 1885 play by Alexander Dumas fils

== Other uses ==
- Denise, Mato Grosso, a municipality in Brazil
- Hurricane Denise, a list of tropical cyclones
- SP-350 Denise, a small submarine also known as the "Diving saucer"
- A brand name of desogestrel

== See also ==
- Saint Denise (disambiguation)
- Danise (disambiguation)
