= List of storms named Dinah =

The name Dinah has been used for eleven tropical cyclones in the Western Pacific Ocean and one in the Australian region.

In the Western Pacific:

- Typhoon Dinah (1952) (T5202) – made landfall in Japan.
- Typhoon Dinah (1956) (T5611) – made landfall in eastern China.
- Typhoon Dinah (1959) (T5919)
- Typhoon Dinah (1962) (T6221) – made landfall in southern China.
- Typhoon Dinah (1965) (T6510, 13W, Huling)
- Typhoon Dinah (1967) (T6730, 37W, Uring) – killed 37 people in Japan.
- Typhoon Dinah (1971) (T7108, 08W, Herming) – made landfall in the Philippines and southern China.
- Typhoon Dinah (1974) (T7405, 06W, Bising)
- Typhoon Dinah (1977) (T7710, 14W, Openg)
- Typhoon Dinah (1984) (T8406, 06W)
- Typhoon Dinah (1987) (T8712, 12W, Luding)

In the Australian region:

- Cyclone Dinah (1967) – considered the strongest storm to ever approach the coast of southern Queensland by the Australian Bureau of Meteorology; also crossed into the South Pacific Ocean.

== See also ==
Similar names that have been used for tropical cyclones:

- Cyclone Dana (2024) – a North Indian Ocean tropical cyclone.
- Cyclone Dina (2002) – a South-West Indian Ocean tropical cyclone.
- List of storms named Dinang – also used in the Western Pacific Ocean.
- List of storms named Donna – used in three tropical cyclone basins.
