= Doreen =

Doreen may refer to:

- Doreen (given name), a feminine given name in English-speaking countries; any of several people or fictional characters

== Songs ==
- "Doreen", on the 1981 Frank Zappa album You Are What You Is
- "Doreen", on the 1993 Half Man Half Biscuit album This Leaden Pall
- "Doreen", on the 1995 Old 97's album Wreck Your Life
- "Doreen", on the 2010 Ace of Base album The Golden Ratio
- "Doreen", on the 2015 Turnpike Troubadours album The Turnpike Troubadours

== Other uses ==
- Doreen, a cultivar of scuppernong, which is a variety of Vitis rotundifolia, a species of grape
- Doreen, Victoria, a suburb of Melbourne, Australia
- Doreen: The Story of a Singer, 1894 novel by Edna Lyall
- Doreen (book), 1917 poetry collection by C. J. Dennis
- Hurricane Doreen, any of several named storms

== See also ==
- Dorreen station, a railway station on the Canadian National Railway main line
