= Danise (name) =

Danise is a given name and surname. Notable people with the name include:

- Danise Swain (died 2026), wife of Jim Baird (politician)
- Giuseppe Danise (1882–1963), Italian operatic baritone
- Shannon Danise Higgins-Cirovski (born 1968), American former soccer midfielder

== See also ==
- Denise (disambiguation)
