= List of storms named Welpring =

The name Welpring has been used to name six tropical cyclones in the Philippine Area of Responsibility in the Western Pacific Ocean, all named by PAGASA and its predecessor, the Philippine Weather Bureau:

- Typhoon Kathy (1964) (T6414, 14W, Welpring) – the largest and longest-lived typhoon of the 1964 season.
- Typhoon Louise (1976) (T7622, 26W, Welpring) – an intense typhoon that caused minor impacts to the Philippines and Japan.
- Typhoon Wynne (1980) (T8018, 24W, Welpring) – rapidly intensified to become the strongest storm of the 1980 season.
- Typhoon Bill (1984) (T8426 30W, Welpring) – looped twice during its lifetime.
- Tropical Storm Tess (1988) (T8828, 50W, Welpring) – developed over the Philippines and struck Southern Vietnam.
- Typhoon Soulik (2000) (T0022, 50W, Welpring) – lasted until early January 2001.

After the 2000 Pacific typhoon season, the PAGASA revised their naming lists, and the name Welpring was excluded from the revised lists.

== See also ==
- List of storms named Weling – a similar name that has also been used in the Western Pacific Ocean.
