= List of storms named Wening =

The name Wening has been used to name three tropical cyclones in the Philippine Area of Responsibility in the Western Pacific Ocean, all named by PAGASA (and its predecessor, the Philippine Weather Bureau):

- Tropical Storm Olga (1966) (T6634, 37W, Wening) – dissipated north of Luzon.
- Tropical Storm Marge (1970) (T7022, 24W, Wening) – crossed southern Luzon before dissipating in the South China Sea off the Vietnamese coast.
- Typhoon Elaine (1974) (T7426, 30W, Wening) – a Category 2-equivalent typhoon that hit northern Luzon.

The name Wening was retired after the 1974 season, and was replaced by Weling.

== See also ==
Similar names that have been used for tropical cyclones:

- List of storms named Gening – also used in the Western Pacific Ocean.
- List of storms named Sening – also used in the Western Pacific Ocean.
- List of storms named Weling – also used in the Western Pacific Ocean.
