= List of storms named Dawn =

The name Dawn has been used for four tropical cyclones worldwide: one in the Atlantic Ocean, one in the Western Pacific Ocean and two in the Australian Region

In the Atlantic Ocean:

- Hurricane Dawn (1972) – a Category 1 hurricane that affected The Bahamas and East Coast of the United States.

In the Western Pacific Ocean:

- Tropical Storm Dawn (1998) – a weak tropical cyclone that caused 187 deaths in Vietnam, and was described as the worst storm to hit the region in 3 decades.

In the Australian Region:

- Cyclone Dawn (1970) – a Category 2 tropical cyclone that affected the Far North Queensland and New Caledonia with heavy rain.
- Cyclone Dawn (1976) – a Category 2 tropical cyclone that affected Eastern states of Australia.
