= List of storms named Deanna =

The name Deanna was used for two tropical cyclones in the Northwestern Pacific Ocean:

- Tropical Storm Deanna (1992) – a weak tropical storm that did not affect land.
- Tropical Storm Deanna (1995) – a weak tropical storm that made landfall in The Philippines and Taiwan.

== See also ==
- List of storms named Dean, similar name used in the North Atlantic Ocean
- List of storms named Dinah, similarly-sounding name used in the Western Pacific Ocean
- Cyclone Dana (2024), similarly-named cyclone in the North Indian Ocean
- Cyclone Dina (2002), South-West Indian Ocean tropical cyclone with a similarly-sounding name
