= List of storms named Binang =

The name Binang has been used for three tropical cyclones in the Western Pacific Ocean, all named by the Philippine Atmospheric, Geophysical and Astronomical Services Administration (PAGASA):

- Typhoon Faye (1965) (T6532, 39W, Binang) – a strong typhoon which paralleled the coasts of the Philippines and Japan but did not impact land.
- Tropical Storm Jeff (1981) (T8127, 27W, Binang) – a weak tropical storm that stayed at sea.
- Tropical Depression Binang (1993) – a short-lived tropical depression only recognized by PAGASA.

== See also ==
Similar names that have been used for tropical cyclones:

- List of storms named Bining – also used in the Western Pacific Ocean.
- List of storms named Dinang – also used in the Western Pacific Ocean.
