= List of storms named Weling =

The name Weling has been used to name four tropical cyclones in the Philippine Area of Responsibility in the Western Pacific Ocean, all named by PAGASA:

- Typhoon Lola (1978) (T7821, 22W, Weling) – crossed the Philippines and later struck southern China.
- Typhoon Nancy (1982) (T8222, 24W, Weling) – a destructive typhoon that moved through Vietnam and the Philippines.
- Typhoon Joe (1986) (T8625, 22W, Weling) – passed northeast of Luzon.
- Tropical Storm Luke (1994) (25W, Weling) – brushed northern Luzon before crossing Hainan and Vietnam.

== See also ==
Similar names that have been used for tropical cyclones:

- List of storms named Deling – also used in the Western Pacific Ocean.
- List of storms named Heling – also used in the Western Pacific Ocean.
- List of storms named Welpring – also used in the Western Pacific Ocean.
- List of storms named Wening – also used in the Western Pacific Ocean.
