= List of storms named Deling =

The name Deling was used for nine tropical cyclones in the Philippine Area of Responsibility in the Western Pacific Ocean. All storms were named by PAGASA or its predecessor, the Philippine Weather Bureau:

- Typhoon Judy (1966) (T6603, 03W, Deling) – a typhoon which impacted southern Taiwan and downed a United States Navy aircraft
- Typhoon Olga (1970) (T7002, 02W, Deling) – an intense typhoon that caused heavy damage in Japan and South Korea
- Typhoon Gilda (1974) (T7408, 09W, Deling) – a deadly and destructive typhoon that struck Japan and South Korea
- Tropical Storm Shirley (1978) (T7805, 05W, Deling) – hit Vietnam as a tropical storm
- Tropical Storm Tess–Val (1982) (T8206, 06W and 08W, Deling) – a short-lived storm that existed east of Taiwan
- Typhoon Nancy (1986) (T8605, 05W, Deling) – a Category 1-equivalent typhoon that hit Taiwan and then passed off the coast of China and South Korea
- Tropical Storm Robyn (1990) (T9007, 08W, Deling) – a long-lived tropical storm that caused minor impacts in South Korea and the Russian Far East
- Tropical Depression Deling (1994) (04W) – caused over 2,000 people to evacuate from Davao City according to press reports
- Typhoon Rex (1998) (T9804, 06W, Deling) – a Category 4-equivalent typhoon that stayed out at sea east of Japan but brought heavy flooding to Honshu

== See also ==
Similar names that have been used for tropical cyclones:

- List of storms named Daling – also used in the Western Pacific Ocean
- List of storms named Delang – also used in the Western Pacific Ocean
- List of storms named Delia – used in the Atlantic Ocean and in in the South-West Indian Ocean
- List of storms named Heling – also used in the Western Pacific Ocean
- List of storms named Weling – also used in the Western Pacific Ocean
