= List of storms named Heling =

The name Heling has been used for nine tropical cyclones in the Philippine Area of Responsibility in the Western Pacific Ocean. All storms were named by PAGASA or its predecessor, the Philippine Weather Bureau:

- Tropical Depression Heling (1966) – a short-lived tropical depression that was only tracked by PAGASA.
- Tropical Storm Violet (1970) (T7008, 09W, Heling) – a minimal tropical storm that affected the Philippines and China.
- Tropical Storm Jean (1974) (T7411, 12W, Heling) – a severe tropical storm that hit Taiwan and eastern China.
- Tropical Storm Della (1978) (T7812, 13W, Heling) – another tropical storm which hit Taiwan and China.
- Tropical Depression Heling (1982) – a weak tropical depression only recognized by PAGASA.
- Typhoon Roger (1986) (T8608, 08W, Heling) – a relatively strong typhoon that brushed the coast of Japan.
- Typhoon Becky (1990) (T9016, 16W, Heling) – made landfall in the Philippines and Vietnam, killing at least 32 people.
- Tropical Depression Heling (1994) – another tropical depression that was only monitored by PAGASA.
- Typhoon Yanni (1998) (T9809, 14W, Heling) – skirted the Taiwanese coast as a typhoon before striking South Korea as a tropical storm, claiming 50 lives.

The name Heling was later included in PAGASA's revised list of tropical cyclone names. However, it has been relegated to the auxiliary list for List IV (which was first used in 2004).

== See also ==
Similar names that have been used for tropical cyclones:

- List of storms named Deling – also used in the Western Pacific Ocean.
- List of storms named Helen – used in the Western Pacific Ocean and three other tropical cyclone basins.
- List of storms named Weling – also used in the Western Pacific Ocean.
