= List of storms named Daryl =

The name Daryl has been used for three tropical cyclones in the Australian region of the Southern Hemisphere.

- Cyclone Daryl (1984) – a Category 4 severe tropical cyclone, never affected land.
- Cyclone Daryl (1995) – remained in the open ocean.
- Cyclone Daryl (2006) – a Category 2 tropical cyclone that tracked parallel to the West Australian coast.
