= List of storms named Dinang =

The name Dinang has been used for two tropical cyclones in the Western Pacific Ocean, both named by the Philippine Atmospheric, Geophysical and Astronomical Services Administration (PAGASA):

- Typhoon Lee (1981) (T8129, 29W, Dinang) – a destructive late-season typhoon which impacted the Philippines, killing at least 188 people.
- Typhoon Ed (1993) (T9319, 25W, Dinang) – the only Category 5-equivalent super typhoon to exist during the 1993 season; did not affect land areas.

== See also ==
Similar names that have been used for tropical cyclones:

- List of storms named Binang – also used in the Western Pacific Ocean.
- Typhoon Didang (1976) – internationally known as Typhoon Olga.
- List of storms named Dinah – used in the Western Pacific Ocean and the Australian region.
- Typhoon Ditang (2000) – internationally known as Typhoon Kirogi.
