= List of storms named Diding =

The name Diding was used for ten tropical cyclones by the Philippine Atmospheric, Geophysical and Astronomical Services Administration (PAGASA) and its predecessor, the Philippine Weather Bureau, in the Western Pacific Ocean.

- Typhoon Trix (1963) (T6305, 12W, Diding) – a minimal typhoon that struck the Philippines and China.
- Tropical Storm Wilda (1967) (T6705, 05W, Diding) – an early-season tropical storm that stayed at sea.
- Typhoon Wanda (1971) (T7104, 04W, Diding) – a relatively strong typhoon which claimed dozens of lives in the Philippines and Vietnam.
- Typhoon Ora (1975) (T7504, 06W, Diding) – a system which intensified from a tropical to a typhoon in a span of 30 hours, eventually striking East China.
- Tropical Storm 05W (1979) (T7905, 05W, Diding) – a system which was considered by the Joint Typhoon Warning Center (JTWC) as a mere tropical depression.
- Typhoon Abby (1983) (T8305, 05W, Diding) – a violent typhoon that only caused minimal damage in Japan and the Philippines.
- Severe Tropical Storm Vernon (1987) (T8706, 06W, Diding) – a Category 1-equivalent severe tropical storm which passed northeast of the Philippines and skirted Taiwan.
- Typhoon Yunya (1991) (T9105, 05W, Diding) – a relatively strong typhoon that struck Luzon during the climactic eruption of Mount Pinatubo.
- Tropical Storm Irving (1995) (T9506, 09W, Diding) – a short-lived tropical storm which made landfall on Leizhou Peninsula.
- Severe Tropical Storm Kate (1999) (T9901, 04W, Diding) – an early-season tropical storm that formed in east-central Philippines before heading out to sea.
