= List of storms named Delang =

The name Delang has been used to name three tropical cyclones in the Philippine Area of Responsibility in the Western Pacific Ocean by the PAGASA and its predecessor, the Philippine Weather Bureau:

- Tropical Storm Kit (1974) (T7432, 36W, Delang) – a late-season tropical storm that struck the Philippines.
- Tropical Depression 30W (1978) (30W, Delang) – made landfall in Luzon.
- Typhoon Verne (1994) (T9431, 34W, Delang) – executed a loop before turning away from the Philippines.

After the 2000 Pacific typhoon season, the PAGASA revised their naming lists, and the name Delang was excluded from the new lists.

== See also ==
Similar names that have been used for tropical cyclones:

- List of storms named Deling – also used in the Western Pacific Ocean.
- List of storms named Elang – also used in the Western Pacific Ocean.
