= List of storms named Doug =

The name Doug has been used for two tropical cyclones in the West Pacific Ocean:

- Tropical Depression Doug (1991) – a weak tropical depression; did not make landfall.
- Typhoon Doug (1994) – a Category 5 super typhoon that affected East China and Taiwan.
