= List of storms named Daphne =

The name Daphne was used for four tropical cyclones worldwide: two in the Australian region, one in the South Pacific Ocean and one in the South-West Indian Ocean.

In the South-West Indian Ocean:

- Cyclone Daphne (1966) – a powerful tropical storm, affected Madagascar and Mozambique.

In the Australian Region:

- Cyclone Daphne–Fifi (1982) – a Category 2 tropical cyclone (Australian scale) that hit Australia.
- Cyclone Daphne (1991) – crossed into the Indian Ocean.

After the 1990–91 season, the name Daphne was removed from the Australian name list.

In the South Pacific:

- Cyclone Daphne (2012) – did not affect land.
