= List of storms named Dom =

The name Dom was used for three tropical cyclones in the West Pacific Ocean:

- Typhoon Dom (1980) – a Category 2 typhoon that brushed the Philippines.
- Tropical Storm Dom (1983) – a weak tropical storm that remained in the open ocean.
- Tropical Storm Dom (1986) – a weak tropical storm that made landfall in Vietnam and caused heavy rainfall and flooding.
