= Saint Denise =

Saint Denise may refer to:

- Peter, Andrew, Paul, and Denise, martyred at Lampsacus in the 3rd century
- Denise, Dativa, Leontia, Tertius, Emilianus, Boniface, Majoricus, and Servus, martyred in Africa in the 5th century

== See also ==
- Denis of Paris
