= List of storms named Delia =

The name Delia has been used for two tropical cyclones worldwide: one in the Atlantic Ocean and one in the South-West Indian Ocean.

In the Atlantic:

- Hurricane Delia (1973) – a Category 1 hurricane that made landfall in Texas.

In the South West Indian:

- Cyclone Delia (1963) – a powerful tropical cyclone minimal affected Madagascar and Reunion.
