= List of storms named Diane =

The name Diane has been used for three tropical cyclones worldwide, one in the Atlantic Ocean and two in the South-West Indian Ocean.

In the Atlantic:

- Hurricane Diane (1955) – caused US$831.7 million (1955 USD) in damage and 184 deaths in the Eastern United States

In the South-West Indian Ocean:

- Tropical Depression Diane (1960)
- Tropical Storm Diane (2020) – caused flooding in Madagascar
