= List of storms named Della =

The name Della has been used for one tropical cyclone in the Central Pacific Ocean and seven in the West Pacific Ocean.

In the Central Pacific:

- Hurricane Della (1957)

In the West Pacific:

- Typhoon Della (1949)
- Typhoon Della (1952)
- Typhoon Della (1960)
- Typhoon Della (1968)
- Typhoon Della (1971)
- Typhoon Della (1974)
- Tropical Storm Della (1978)
