= List of storms named Dorang =

The name Dorang has been used to name two tropical cyclones in the Philippine Area of Responsibility in the West Pacific Ocean:

- Typhoon Clara (1964) (T6427, 35W, Dorang) – a Category 1 typhoon that made landfall Philippines and Vietnam.
- Tropical Storm Ed (1980) – a weak tropical storm that minimal affected Philippines.
