= List of storms named Doyle =

The name Doyle was used for three tropical cyclones in the Northwestern Pacific Ocean:

- Typhoon Doyle (1981) – a Category 1 typhoon, did not make landfall.
- Typhoon Doyle (1984) – a Category 4 typhoon, did not make landfall.
- Typhoon Doyle (1988) – a Category 4 typhoon, did not make landfall.
