= List of storms named Didang =

The name Didang was used for three tropical cyclones by the Philippine Atmospheric, Geophysical and Astronomical Services Administration (PAGASA) and its predecessor, the Philippine Weather Bureau, in the Western Pacific Ocean.

- Severe Tropical Storm Nadine (1968) (T6805, 08W, Didang) – a relatively strong tropical storm which erratically moved between Northern Luzon and Taiwan.
- Tropical Depression Didang (1972) – a weak system that was only tracked by the Philippine Weather Bureau (which eventually became PAGASA several months later)
- Typhoon Olga (1976) (T7605, 05W, Didang) – a strong early-season typhoon which severely affected the Philippines and eventually also impacted Japan.

Due to the destruction caused by its third iteration, the name Didang was retired after the 1976 season, and was replaced by Ditang.
