= List of storms named Drena =

The name Drena has been used for two tropical cyclones in the South Pacific Ocean:

- Cyclone Drena (1985) – a Category 1 tropical cyclone that did not make landfall.
- Cyclone Drena (1997) – a powerful tropical cyclone that caused significant damage throughout New Zealand.

== See also ==
- Tropical Storm Rena (1949) – a West Pacific tropical storm with a similar name.
