= List of storms named David =

The name David has been used for four tropical cyclones worldwide: once each in the Atlantic Ocean, Australian region, South-West Indian Ocean, and West Pacific Ocean. David has also been used for one European windstorm.

In the Atlantic:

- Hurricane David (1979) – a Category 5 hurricane that made landfall in the Dominican Republic and later in both Florida and Georgia, causing over 2,000 deaths people along its path.

The name David was retired after the 1979 season and replaced with Danny.

In the Australian region:

- Cyclone David (1976) – a Category 3 severe tropical cyclone (Australian scale) that made landfall in Queensland.

In the South-West Indian:

- Tropical Storm David (2009) – whose remnants brought heavy rain to the islands of Mauritius and Réunion.

In the West Pacific:

- Typhoon David (1997) (21W) – a Category 2 typhoon that remained over the open ocean.

In Europe:

- Storm David (2017) – brought hurricane-force gusts, rain and severe snowfall particularly to central Europe, creating blizzard conditions in some areas.

== See also ==
Storms with similar names

- Storm Dave (2026) – a European windstorm that affected the United Kingdom, Ireland, Scandinavia, and Germany.
- Storm Davide (2025) – a European windstorm that affected the United Kingdom, France, and Ireland.
