= List of storms named Dominic =

The name Dominic has been used for two tropical cyclones in the Australian region:

- Cyclone Dominic (1982) – a Category 5 tropical cyclone that made landfall near Cape Keerweer.
- Cyclone Dominic (2009) – a Category 2 tropical cyclone that made landfall in Western Australia.
