= List of storms named Delta =

The name Delta has been used for one subtropical cyclone and for two tropical cyclones in the Atlantic Ocean:

- Subtropical Storm Delta (1972) – formed and remained in the central Atlantic
- Tropical Storm Delta (2005) – formed in the eastern Atlantic and became extratropical just before it passed to the north of the Canary Islands
- Hurricane Delta (2020) – peaked as a powerful category 4 hurricane in the western Caribbean before making landfall as a category 2 hurricane in the Yucatán Peninsula and later in Louisiana
