= List of storms named Dadang =

The name Dadang has been used to name two tropical cyclones in the Philippine Area of Responsibility in the West Pacific Ocean:

- Severe Tropical Storm Faye–Gloria (1971) (T7132/7133, 34W/35W, Krising-Dadang) – a system which made landfall in Luzon twice in October after executing a loop
- Tropical Depression Dadang (1983) – a tropical depression that formed off the coast of the Philippines
