= List of storms named Des =

The name Des has been used for two tropical cyclones in the Australian region:

- Cyclone Des (1983) – a Category 1 tropical cyclone that made landfall in Queensland as a tropical depression.
- Cyclone Des (2002) – a Category 1 tropical cyclone that caused minimal damage in New Caledonia.
