= List of storms named Dianne =

The name Dianne has been used for four tropical cyclones worldwide: one in the Western Pacific Ocean and three in the Australian Region.

In the Western Pacific Ocean:

- Typhoon Dianne (1946) – a strong Category 2 typhoon that did not affect land.

In the Australian Region:

- Cyclone Dianne (2002) – never threatened land.
- Cyclone Dianne (2011) – a Category 3 tropical cyclone remained well offshore and was steered drifted towards the west-southwest by a ridge of high pressure while slowly developing further.
- Cyclone Dianne (2025) – a Category 2 tropical cyclone that made landfall in Western Australia.
