= List of storms named Donna =

The name Donna has been used for three tropical cyclones worldwide: one each in the Atlantic Ocean, West Pacific Ocean, and South Pacific Ocean.

In the Atlantic:

- Hurricane Donna (1960)

In the West Pacific:

- Tropical Storm Donna (1947)

In the South Pacific:

- Cyclone Donna (2017)

== See also ==
Storms with similar names

- Cyclone Dana (2024) – a North Indian Ocean severe cyclonic storm that affected India and Bangladesh
- Cyclone Dina (2002) – a South-West Indian Ocean intense tropical cyclone that caused record flooding in Réunion
