= List of storms named Dan =

The name Dan has been used to name five tropical cyclones in the West Pacific Ocean and one in the Australian region.

In the West Pacific:

- Typhoon Dan (1989) (T8928, 29W, Saling)
- Typhoon Dan (1992) (T9226, 27W)
- Tropical Storm Dan (1995) (T9524, 35W, Trining)
- Typhoon Dan (1996) (T9604, 06W)
- Typhoon Dan (1999) (T9925, 26W, Pepang)

In the Australian region:

- Cyclone Dan (1980)

== See also ==
Storms with a similar name

- Cyclone Dana (2024) – a North Indian Ocean severe cyclonic storm
- Tropical Storm Danilo (2020) – a South-West Indian Ocean severe tropical storm
