= 1962–63 South-West Indian Ocean cyclone season =

Cyclone season in the Southwest Indian Ocean

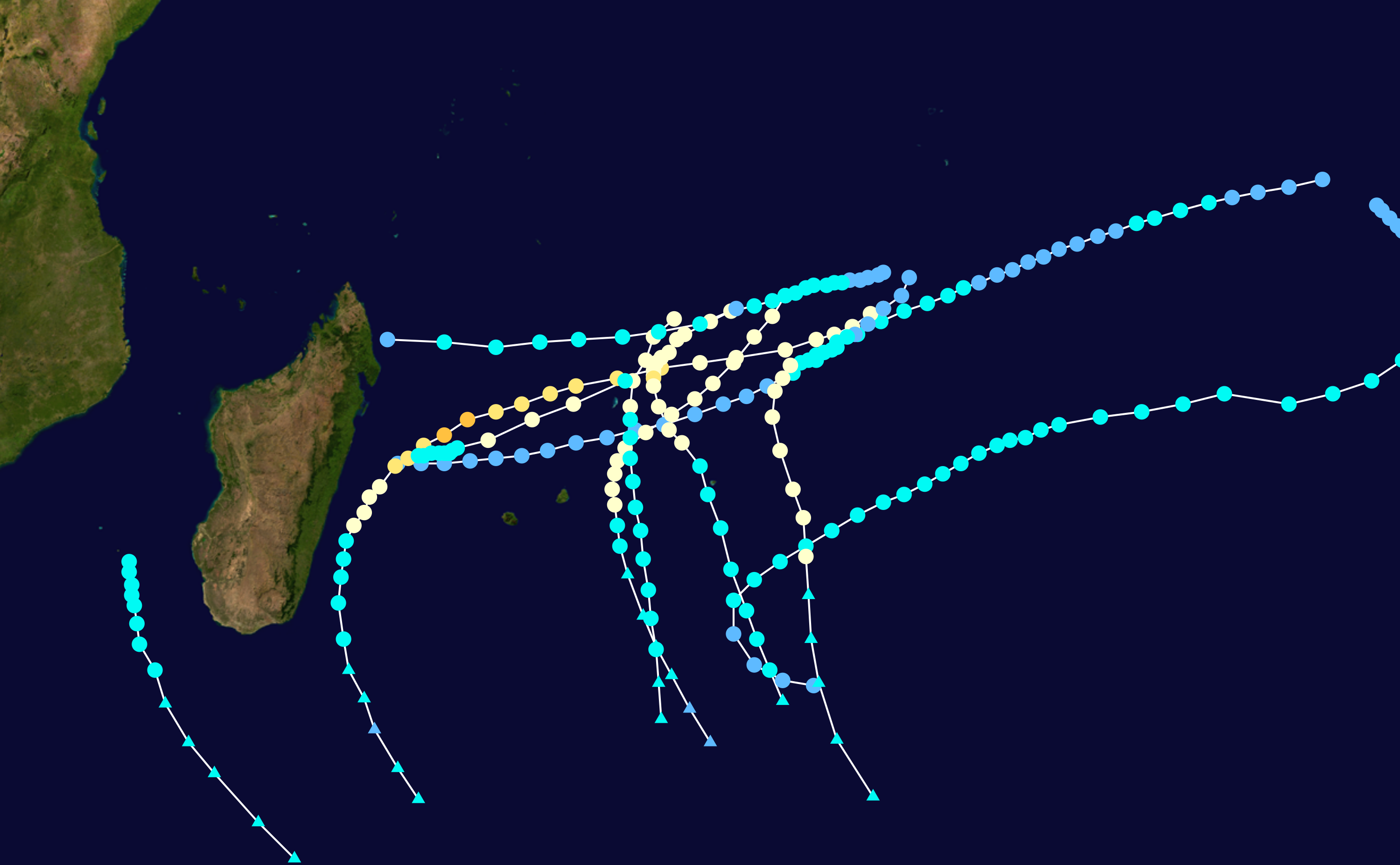
- Season summary map

Seasonal boundaries
- First system formed: October 6, 1962
- Last system dissipated: March 11, 1963

Strongest storm
- Name: Delia
  - Maximum winds: 185 km/h (115 mph)

Seasonal statistics
- Total fatalities: Unknown
- Total damage: Unknown

Related articles
- 1962–63 Australian region cyclone season; 1962–63 South Pacific cyclone season

The 1962–63 South-West Indian Ocean cyclone season was an average cyclone season, although it began early with the first October storm since 1911. Two storms formed in December, both of them passing near the Mascarene Islands.

== Systems ==
=== Tropical Storm Amy ===
- Moderate tropical storm (MFR)
- Tropical storm (SSHWS)
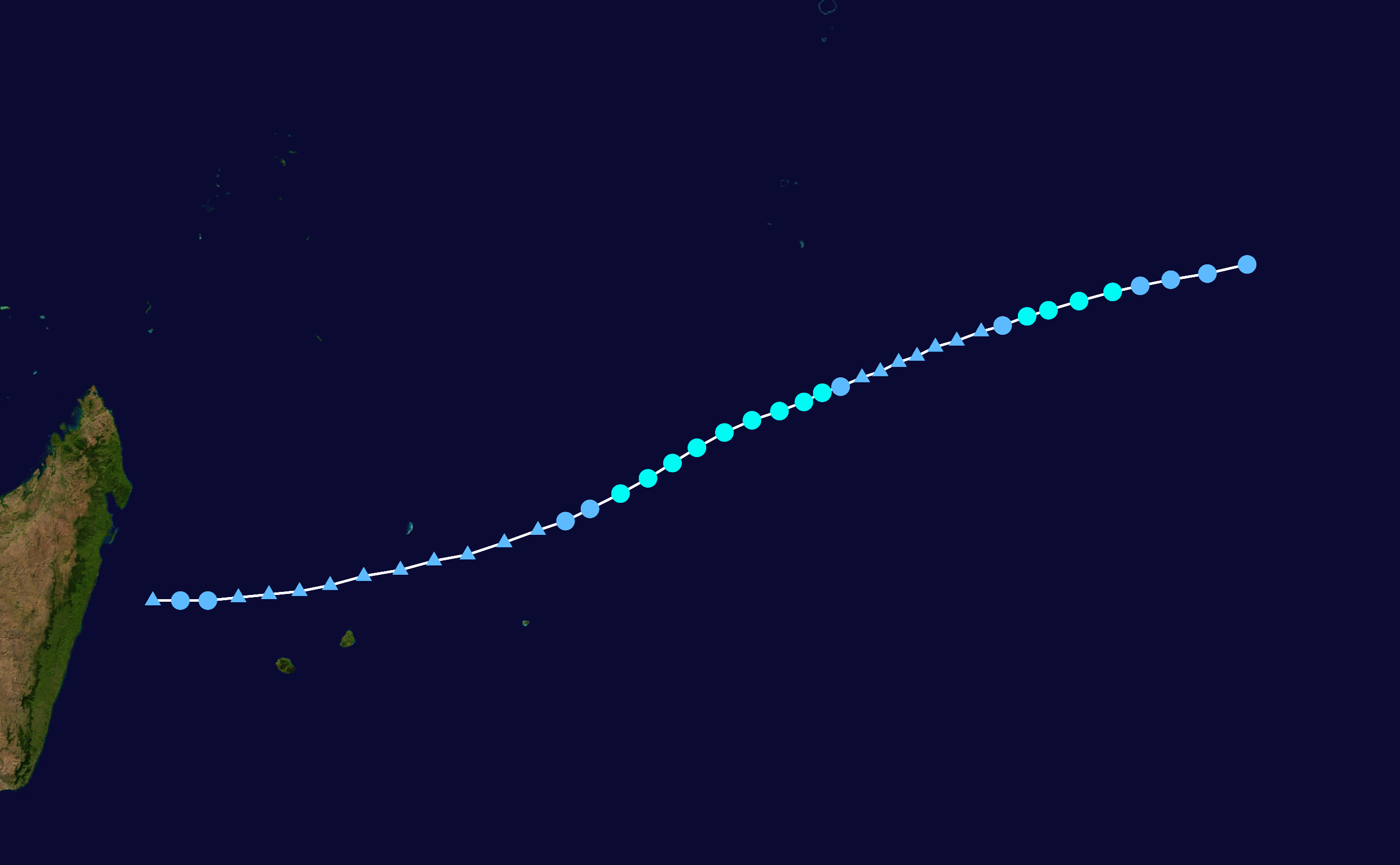
- Duration: October 9 – October 16
- Peak intensity: 65 km/h (40 mph) (10-min);

Toward the beginning of October, an area of low pressure persisted near Diego Garcia, while a strong anticyclone stretched from Madagascar to Île Amsterdam. On October 9, Diego Garcia reported westerly winds and falling pressure, indicating that a tropical cyclone developed that day. This marked the first October tropical storm formation in the basin since 1911. Given the name Amy, the storm moved to the west-southwest, tracked by Television Infrared Observation Satellite (TIROS). Gradual intensification occurred, aided by the anticyclone to the south, and Amy reached peak winds of around 75 km/h (45 mph) on October 10. Passing north of Rodrigues island, the storm's track shifted more westerly as the anticyclone to the south strengthened. Amy later weakened as it approached the east coast of Madagascar, dissipating on October 17.

Amy produced hailstones on Rodrigues while passing nearby, and brushed St. Brandon with gusty winds. The storm also dropped heavy rainfall and produced moderate waves on Réunion.

=== Tropical Cyclone Bertha ===
- Tropical cyclone (MFR)
- Category 2 tropical cyclone (SSHWS)
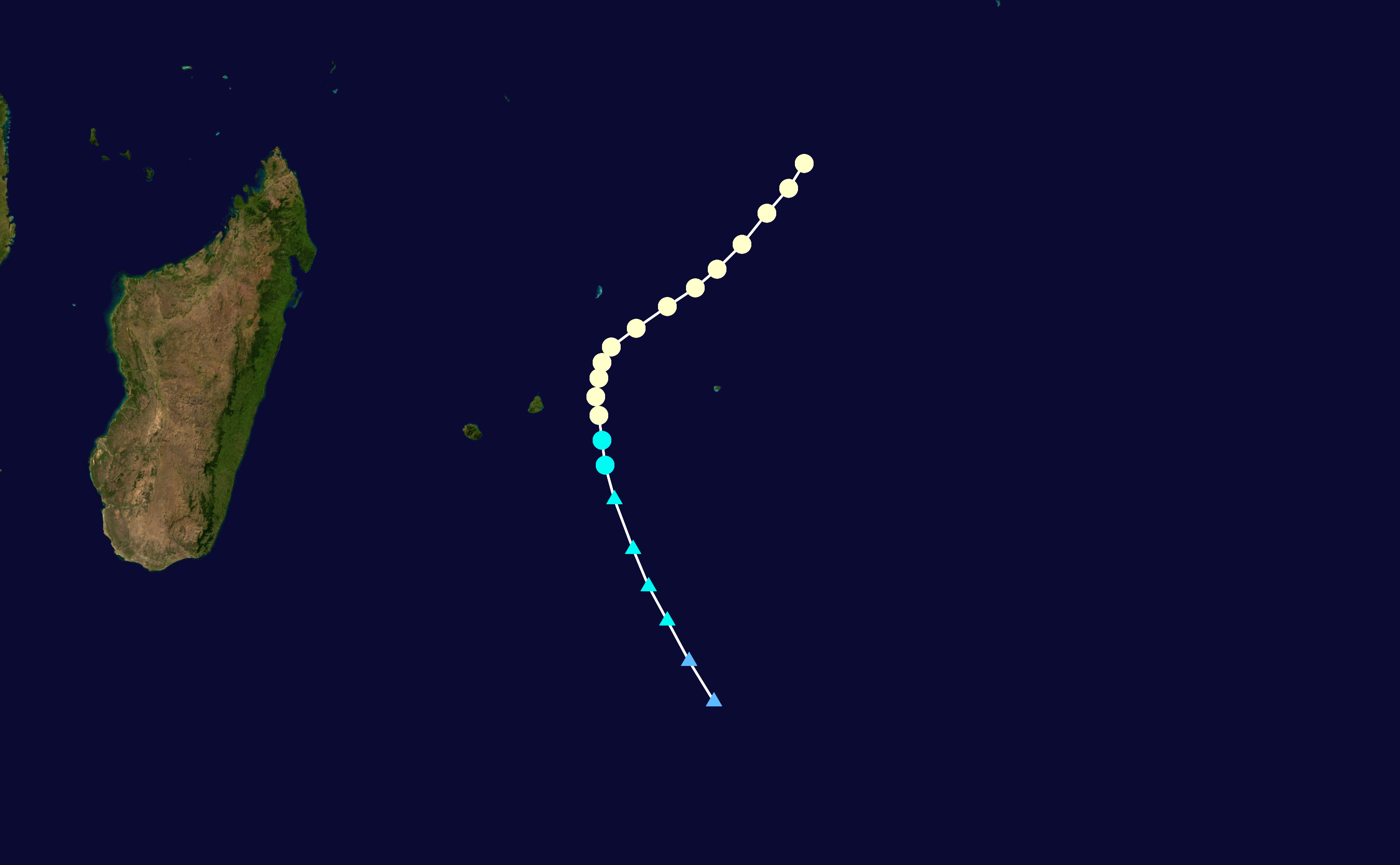
- Duration: December 1 – December 6
- Peak intensity: 130 km/h (80 mph) (10-min);

At the end of November, an area of low pressure persisted near Diego Garcia, associated with the Intertropical Convergence Zone (ITCZ). A circulation developed southwest of the island on November 29, which moved generally to the southwest due to an anticyclone to the south. On December 1, the low pressure area was confirmed to have developed into Tropical Storm Bertha while near the Mascarene Islands. While in the vicinity, the storm produced winds of 55 km/h (35 mph) in Rodrigues. The storm turned to the south, after a polar low weakened the ridge to the south. Bertha passed between Rodrigues and Réunion on December 3, producing only above normal seas. At its peak, the storm reached tropical cyclone status, or peak winds of at least 120 km/h (75 mph). Bertha passed 200 km (120 mi) east of Mauritius on December 4 while continuing generally southward. The storm became extratropical the next day, and was last noted on December 6.

=== Tropical Cyclone Cecile ===
- Severe tropical storm (MFR)
- Category 1 tropical cyclone (SSHWS)
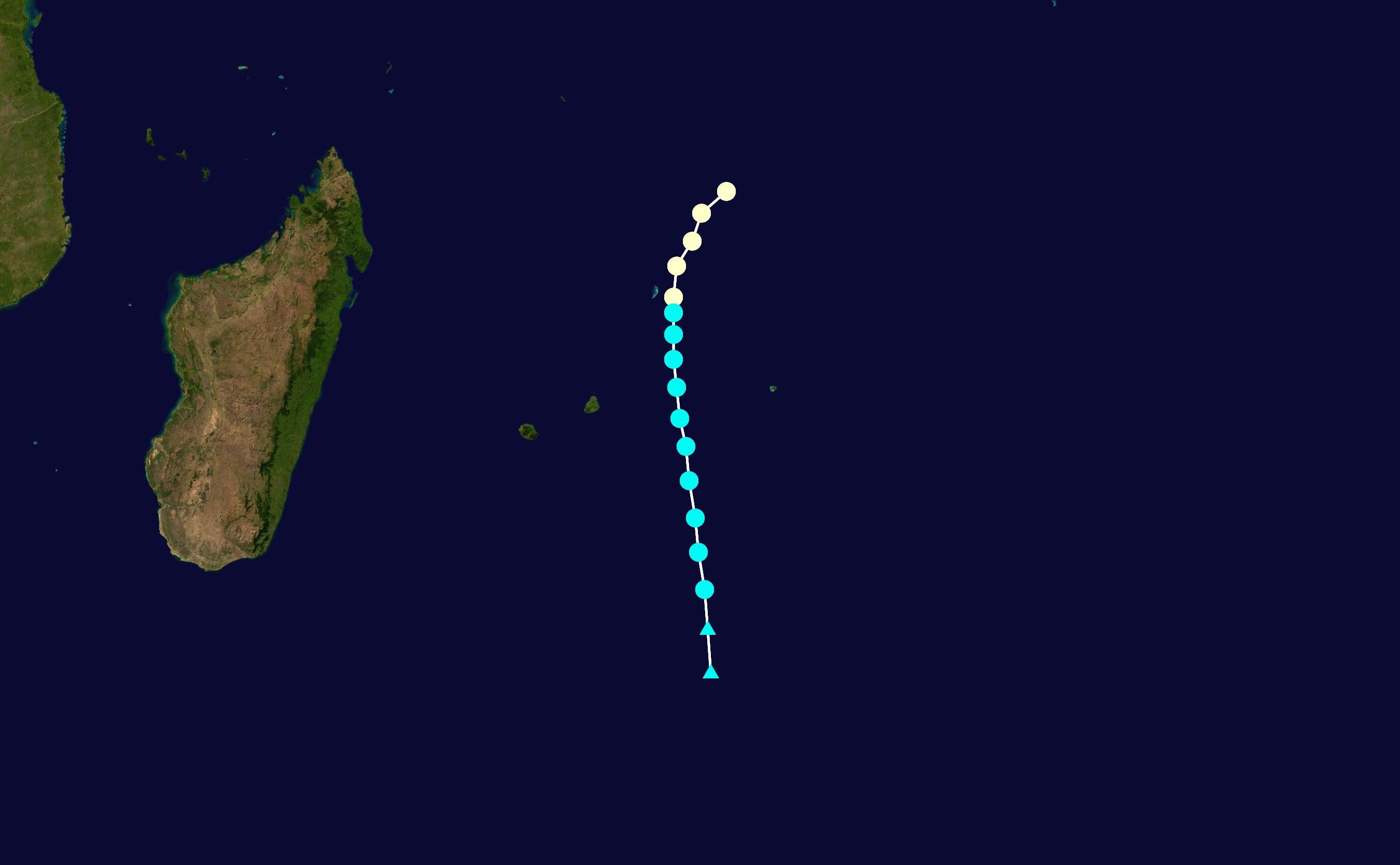
- Duration: December 24 – December 28
- Peak intensity: 100 km/h (65 mph) (10-min); 992 hPa (mbar)

As early as December 18, an area of low pressure persisted near Diego Garcia. By December 24, falling pressures and increasing winds indicated that Tropical Storm Cecile had developed near St. Brandon. At its peak, the storm reached tropical cyclone status, or peak winds of at least 120 km/h (75 mph). On December 25, Cecile passed just east of St. Brandon, where it produced winds of 93 km/h (58 mph) and a pressure of 992 mbar (29.3 inHg). The storm tracked southward, passing between Mauritius and Rodrigues while weakening. Cecile turned more to the south-southeast in tandem with a large anticyclone moving eastward. The storm was last noted on December 28, having become extratropical that day.

=== Tropical Cyclone Delia ===
- Tropical cyclone (MFR)
- Category 3 tropical cyclone (SSHWS)
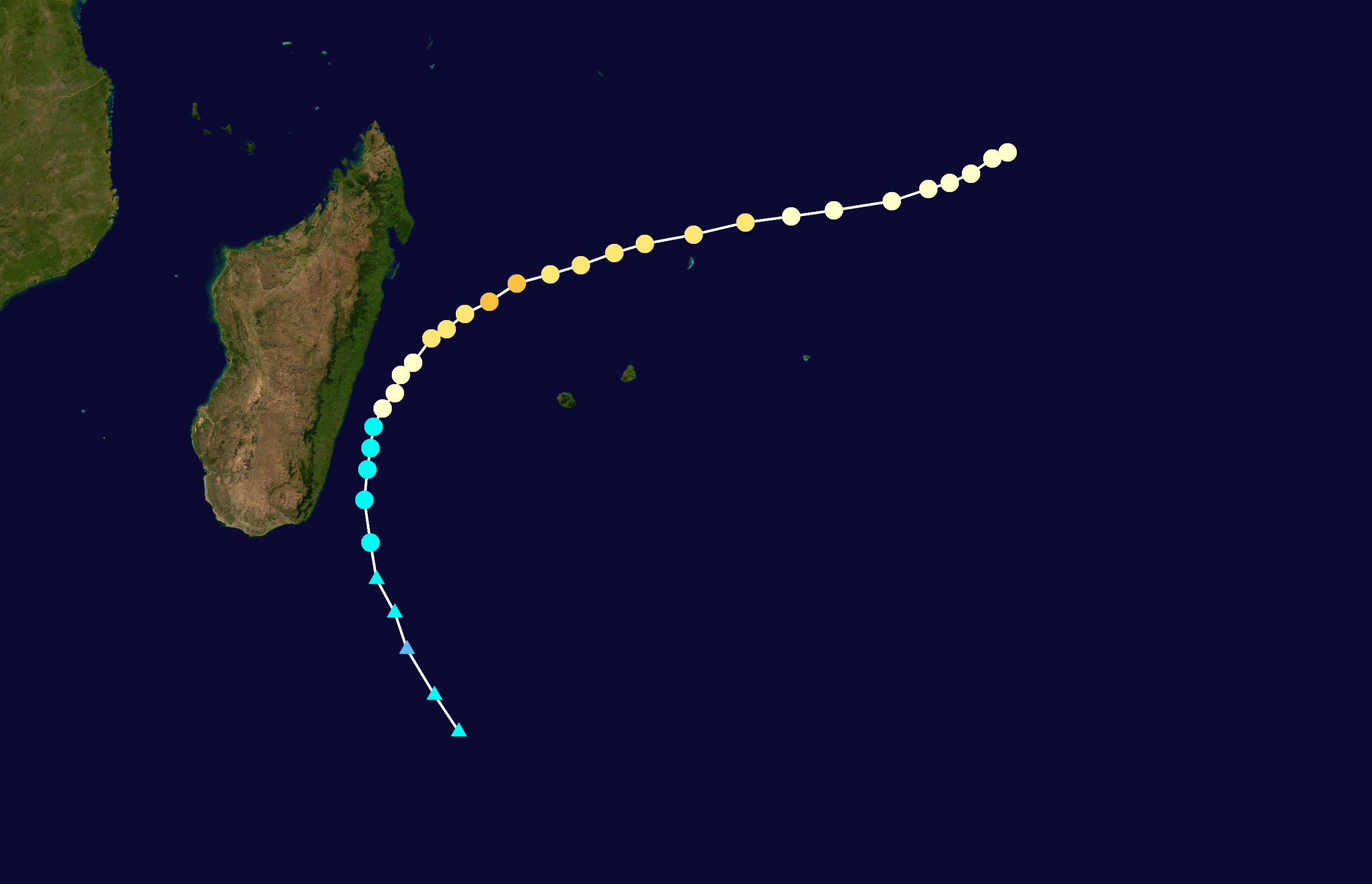
- Duration: January 12 – January 20
- Peak intensity: 155 km/h (100 mph) (10-min);

Delia originated near Diego Garcia and moved southwestward, passing north of St. Brandon, east of Madagascar, and west of Réunion. It lasted from January 12 to January 20.

=== Tropical Storm Emma ===
- Severe tropical storm (MFR)
- Tropical storm (SSHWS)
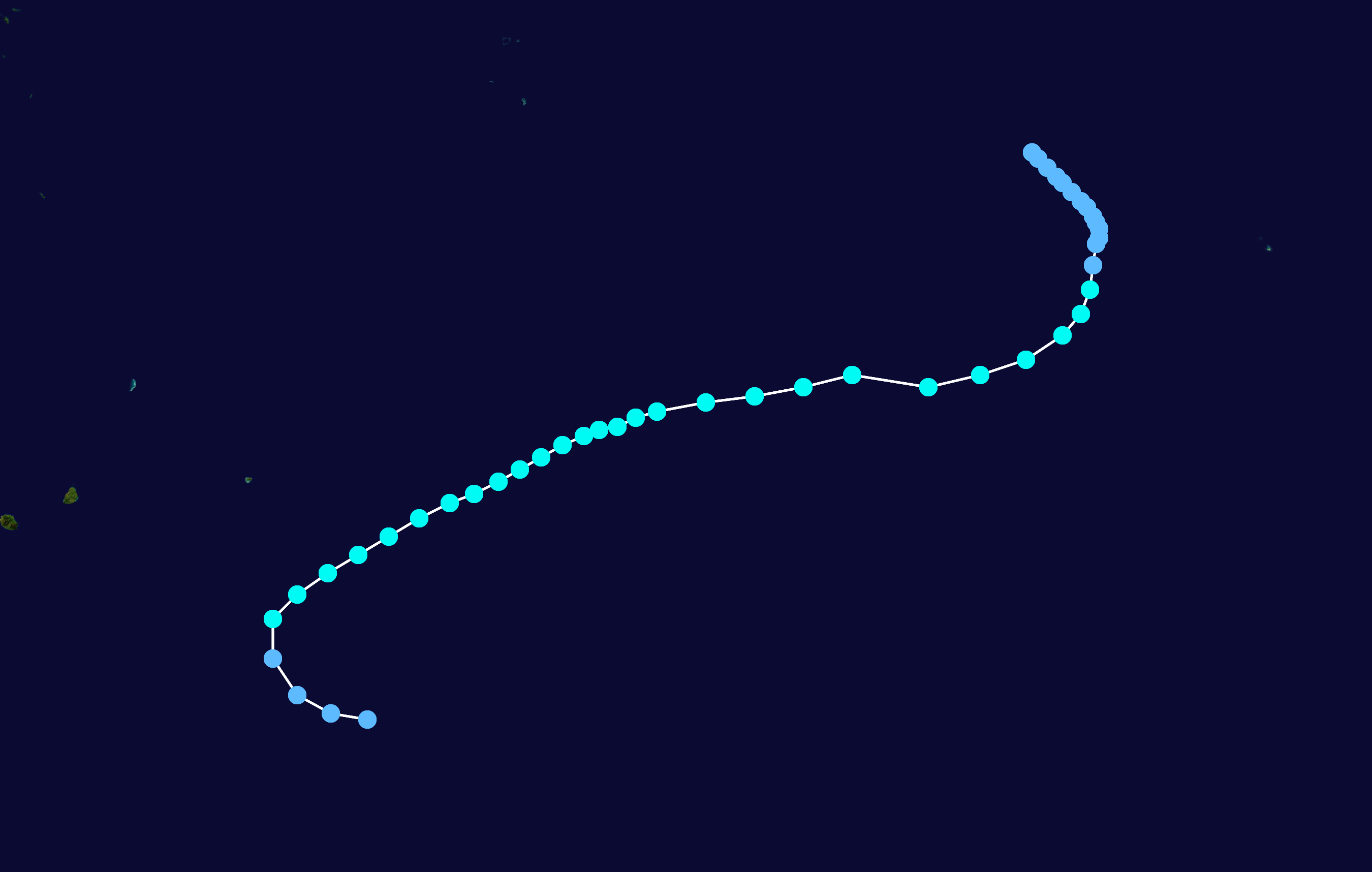
- Duration: January 29 – February 9
- Peak intensity: 100 km/h (65 mph) (10-min); 997 hPa (mbar)

According to the MFR, Emma was a short-lived tropical storm that persisted southeast of Rodrigues, although other warning agencies tracked it for much longer, following it from the Australian basin for 12 days.

=== Tropical Cyclone Fanny ===
- Severe tropical storm (MFR)
- Category 1 tropical cyclone (SSHWS)
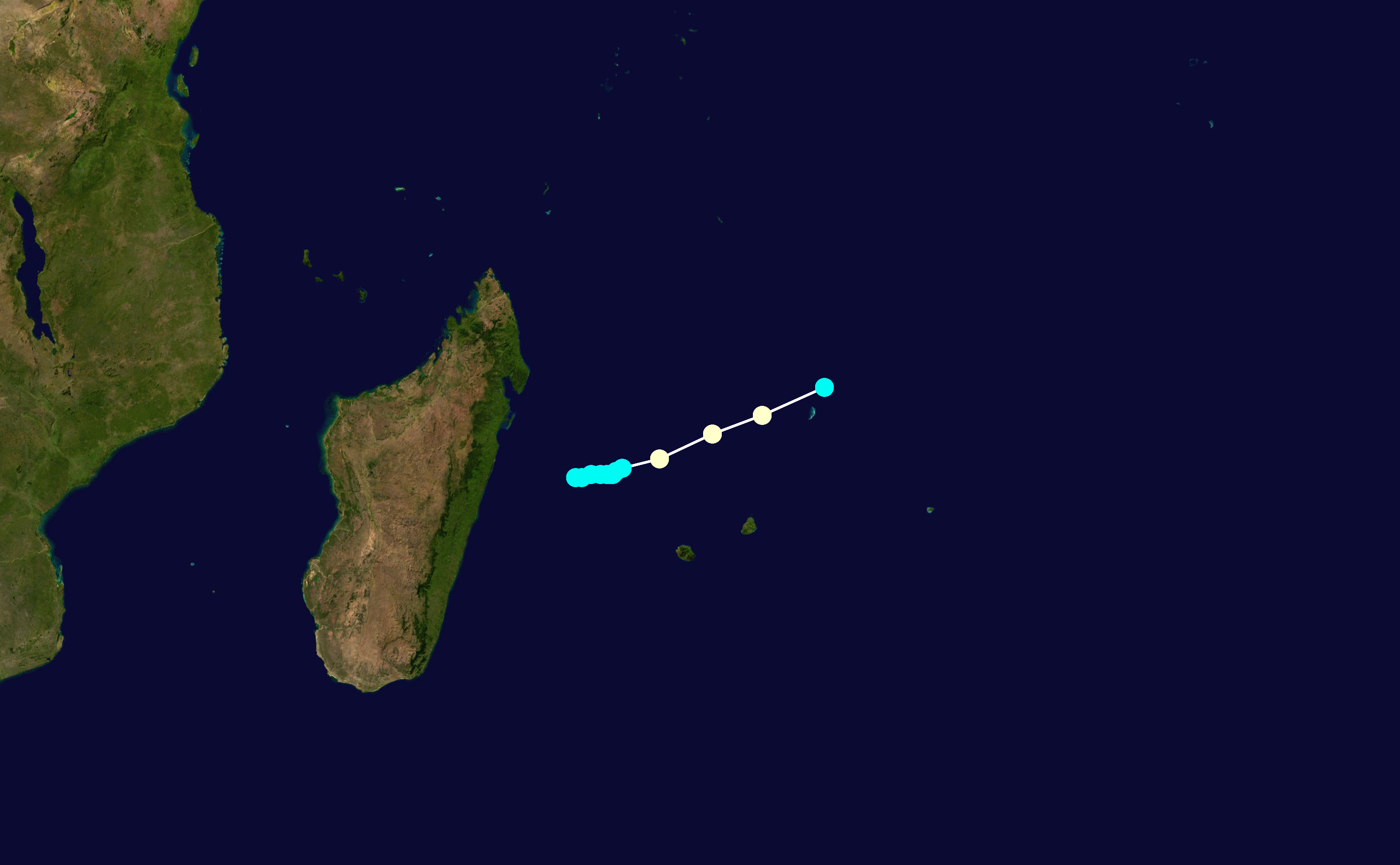
- Duration: February 9 – February 19
- Peak intensity: 110 km/h (70 mph) (10-min);

Fanny developed northeast of St. Brandon and moved to the west-southwest, crossing Madagascar before dissipating on February 19.

=== Tropical Cyclone Grace ===
- Tropical cyclone (MFR)
- Category 2 tropical cyclone (SSHWS)
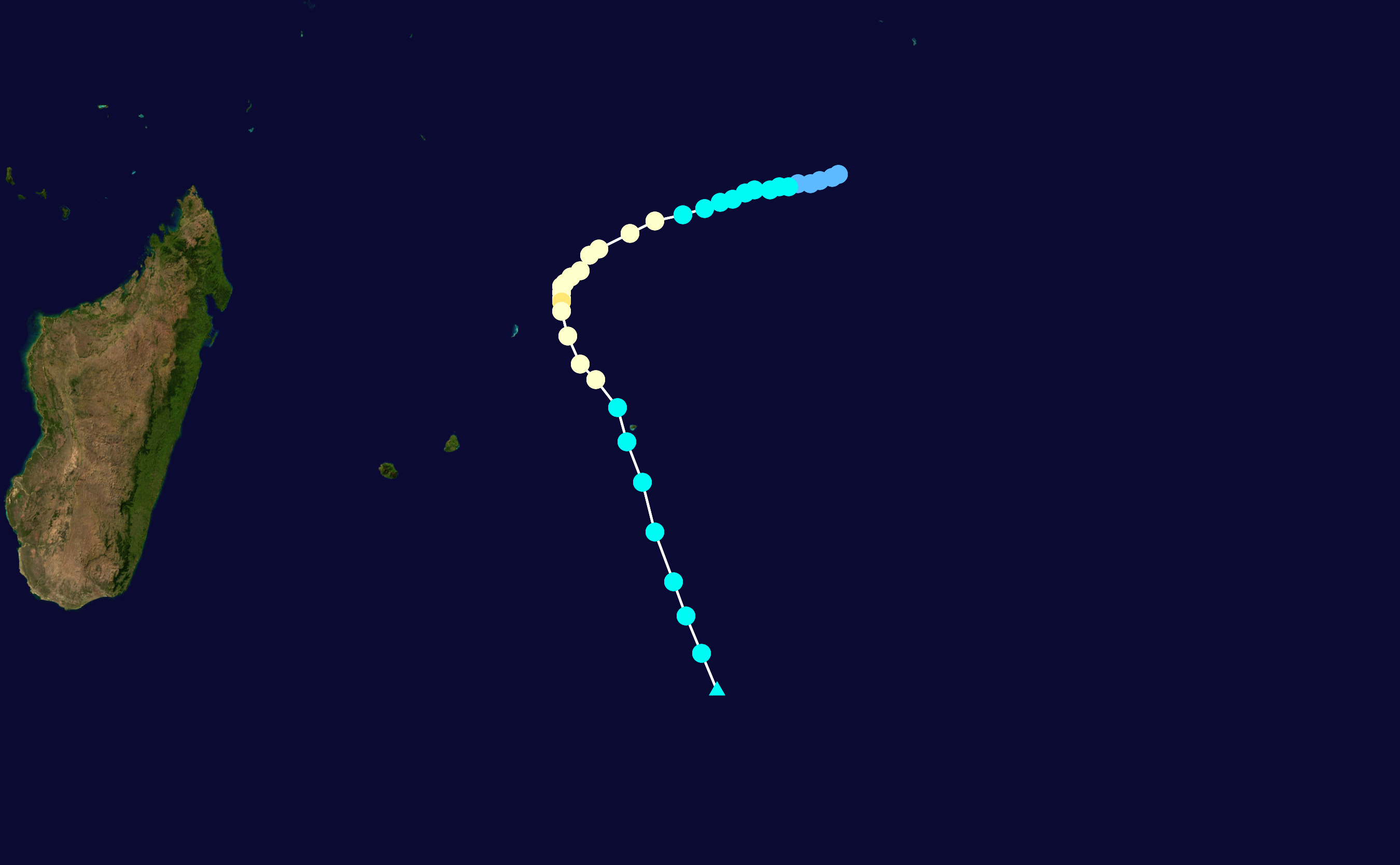
- Duration: February 12 – February 22
- Peak intensity: 140 km/h (85 mph) (10-min);

On February 12, Tropical Storm Grace was moving west-southwestward away from Diego Garcia. It later turned to the south-southeast, passing west of Rodrigues, dissipating on February 22.

=== Tropical Storm Hilda ===
- Moderate tropical storm (MFR)
- Tropical storm (SSHWS)
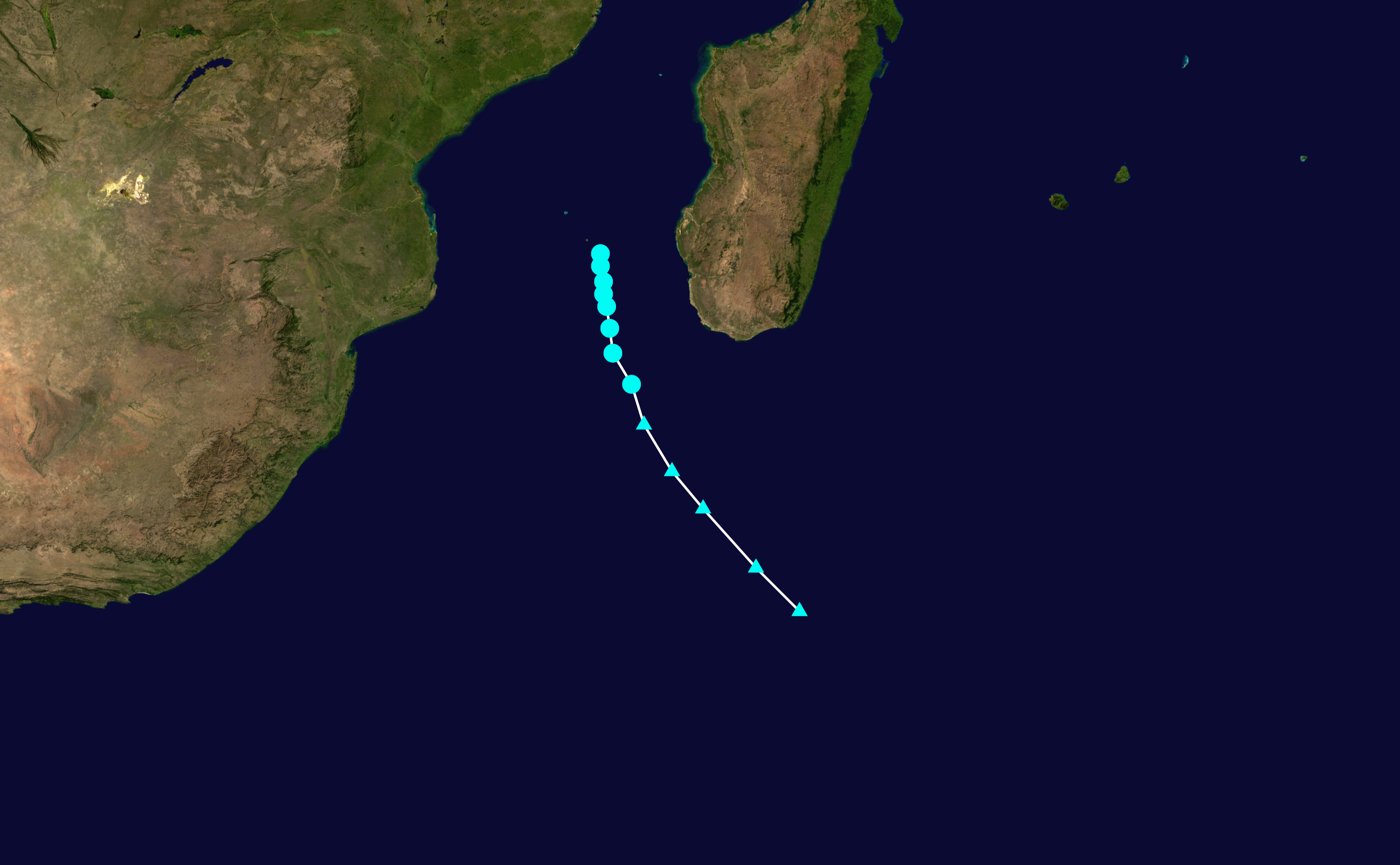
- Duration: February 27 – March 2
- Peak intensity: 85 km/h (50 mph) (10-min);

Tropical Storm Hilda was a short-lived storm that originated in the Mozambique Channel and moved south-southeastward, lasting from February 27 to March 2.

=== Tropical Storm Irene ===
- Moderate tropical storm (MFR)
- Tropical storm (SSHWS)
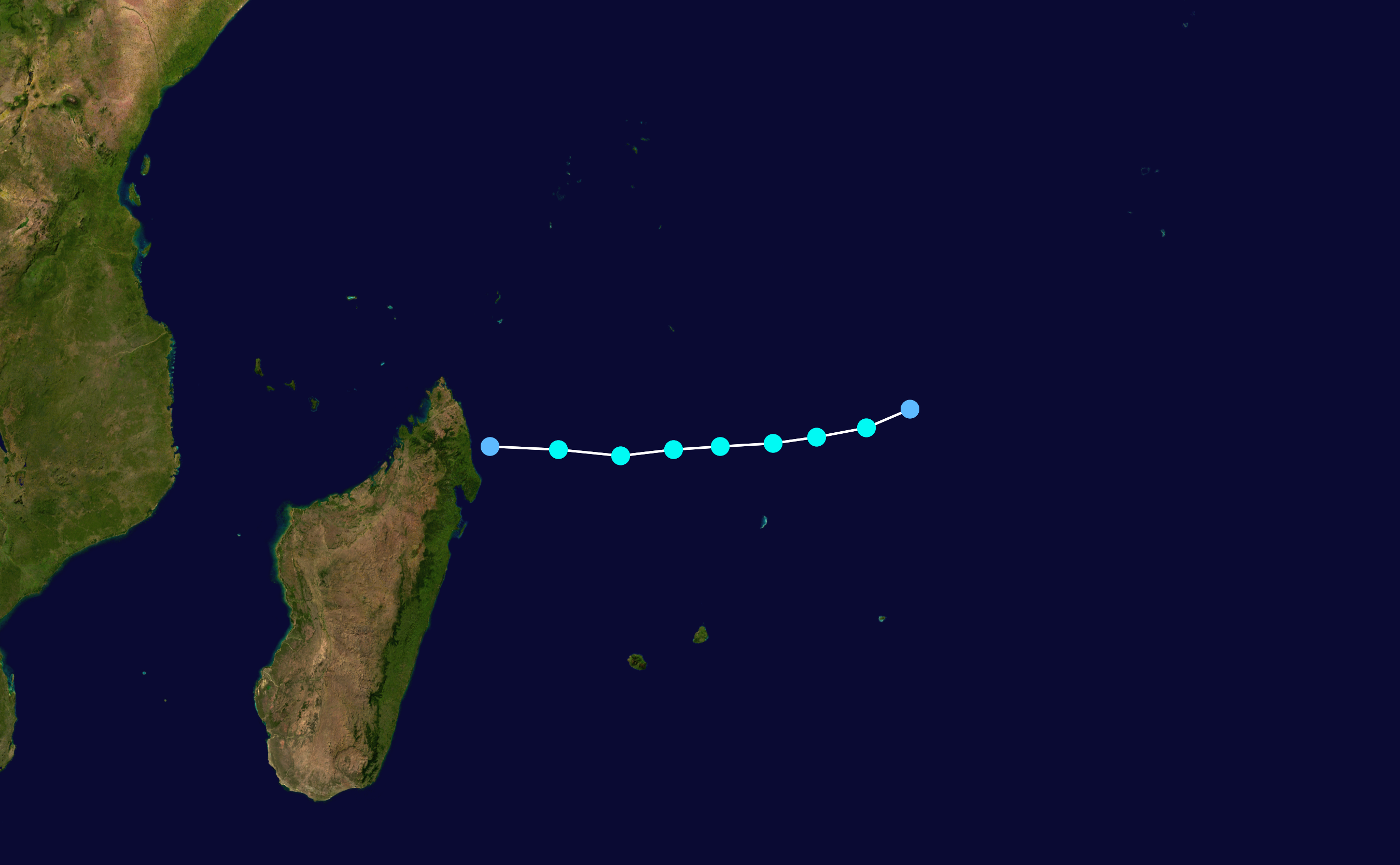
- Duration: March 3 – March 5
- Peak intensity: 85 km/h (50 mph) (10-min);

Tropical Storm Irene was a westward moving storm that originated on March 3, passed north of Tromelin Island, and dissipated on March 5 northeast of the north coast of Madagascar.

=== Tropical Cyclone Julie ===
- Tropical cyclone (MFR)
- Category 1 tropical cyclone (SSHWS)
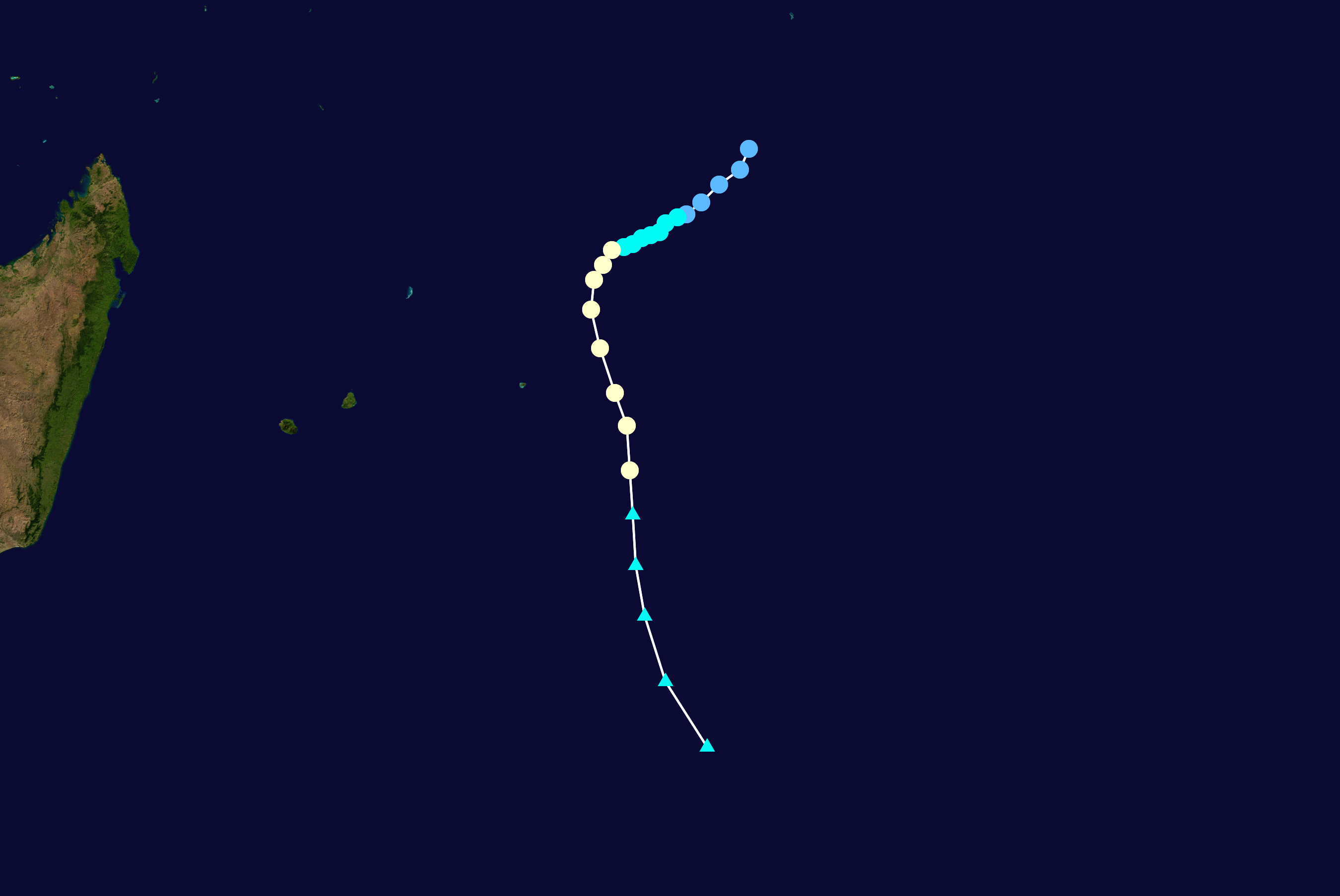
- Duration: March 4 – March 11
- Peak intensity: 130 km/h (80 mph) (10-min);

The final storm of the season, Julie formed on March 4 to the southwest of Diego Garcia. It moved southwestward and later turned to the south-southeast, passing east of Rodrigues, before dissipating on March 11.

== See also ==
- Atlantic hurricane seasons: 1962, 1963
- Eastern Pacific hurricane seasons: 1962, 1963
- Western Pacific typhoon seasons: 1962, 1963
- North Indian Ocean cyclone seasons: 1962, 1963
