= Tropical Storm Dawn (1998) =

1998 tropical cyclone

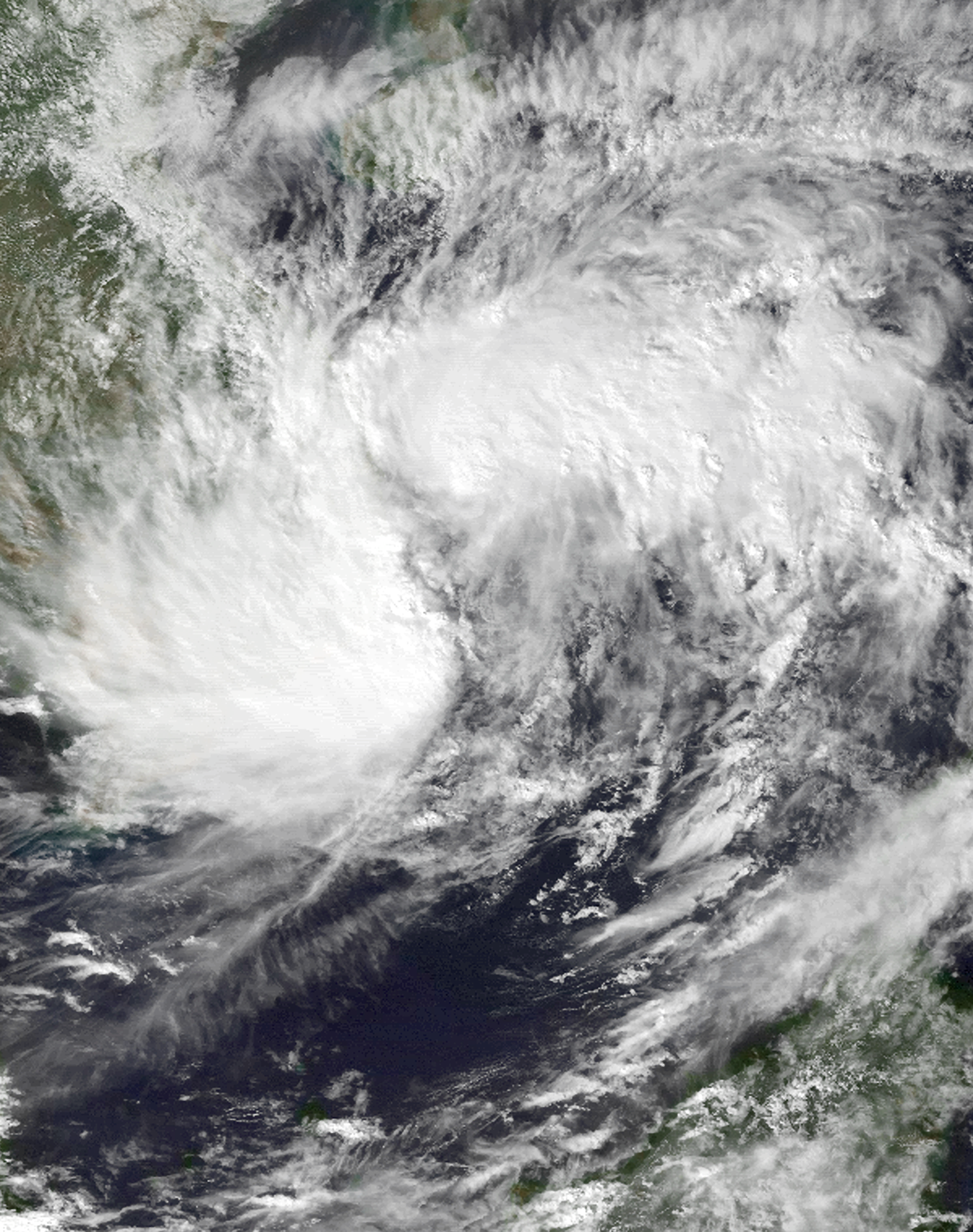
- Dawn at peak intensity on November 19

Meteorological history
- Formed: November 16, 1998
- Dissipated: November 20, 1998

Tropical storm
- 10-minute sustained (JMA)
- Highest winds: 65 km/h (40 mph)
- Lowest pressure: 998 hPa (mbar); 29.47 inHg

Tropical storm
- 1-minute sustained (SSHWS/JTWC)
- Highest winds: 85 km/h (50 mph)

Overall effects
- Fatalities: 187 total
- Damage: $39.3 million (1998 USD)
- Areas affected: Vietnam and Cambodia
- Part of the 1998 Pacific typhoon season

Tropical Storm Dawn was a weak tropical cyclone that caused 187 deaths in Vietnam, and was described as the worst storm to hit the region in 3 decades. The 27th tropical depression and 13th named storm of the 1998 Pacific typhoon season, Dawn formed from a monsoon trough in the South China Sea on November 16. The same day at 18:00 UTC, the Japan Meteorological Agency (JMA) assessed that it had become a tropical depression. The depression continued organizing, and on November 18 at 18:00 UTC, the Joint Typhoon Warning Center (JTWC) upgraded the depression to a tropical storm, giving it the name Dawn. Dawn peaked 1-minute sustained winds of 45 knots (85 km/h; 50 mph) before making landfall near Cam Ranh, moving inland and quickly dissipating.

Dawn caused 187 fatalities in Vietnam, with heavy rains flooding hundreds of thousands of houses.

== Meteorological history ==
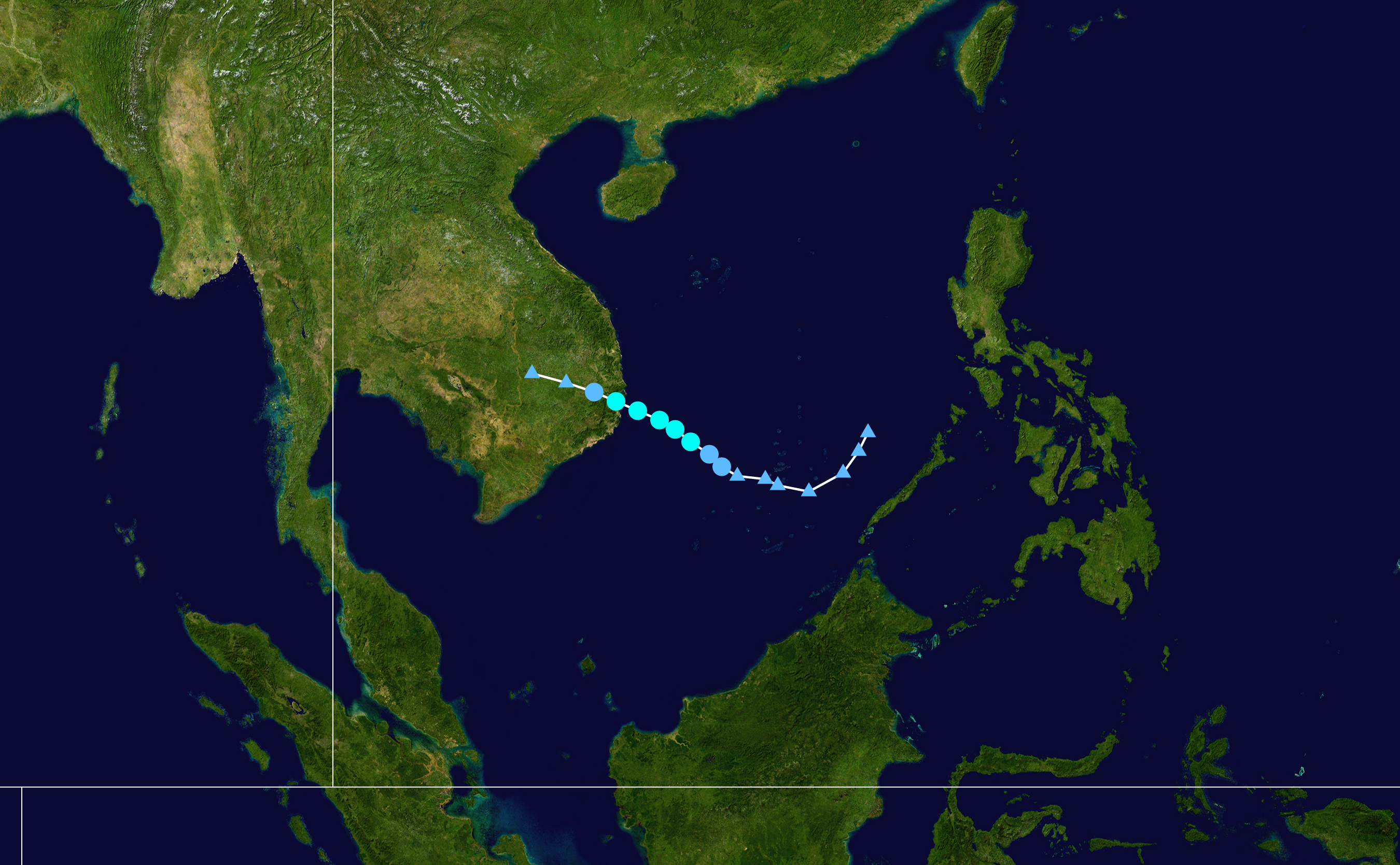
Map plotting the storm's track and intensity, according to the Saffir–Simpson scale Map key Saffir–Simpson scale Tropical depression (≤38 mph, ≤62 km/h) Tropical storm (39–73 mph, 63–118 km/h) Category 1 (74–95 mph, 119–153 km/h) Category 2 (96–110 mph, 154–177 km/h) Category 3 (111–129 mph, 178–208 km/h) Category 4 (130–156 mph, 209–251 km/h) Category 5 (≥157 mph, ≥252 km/h) Unknown Storm type Tropical cyclone Subtropical cyclone Extratropical cyclone, remnant low, tropical disturbance, or monsoon depression

The precursor to Dawn formed in a monsoon trough in the South China Sea, and on November 16, a circulation appeared near the island of Palawan, with the low becoming better organized after a northeasterly surge. The same day at 18:00 UTC, the JMA assessed that it had become a tropical depression. The next day, it was noted as a tropical disturbance by the JTWC, with a ship reporting winds of 25 knots (45 km/h; 30 mph), and on November 18 at 00:30 UTC, the JTWC issued a Tropical Cyclone Formation Alert (TCFA) on the system. On the same day at 06:00 UTC, the JMA issued its first operational warning on a tropical depression, and 3 hours later at 09:00 UTC, the JTWC issued its first warning on Tropical Depression 22W as it was steered northwestwards by a subtropical ridge.

The depression continued organizing, and on the same day at 18:00 UTC, the JTWC upgraded the depression to a tropical storm, giving it the name Dawn. Dawn was a large system, with gales extending 130 nautical miles (240 km; 150 mi) from the center and reaching 150 nautical miles (280 km; 175 mi) in the western quadrants. On November 19 at 06:00 UTC, the JMA upgraded Dawn to a tropical storm, with the JTWC assessing that it had peaked at the same time, with 1-min sustained winds of 45 knots (85 km/h; 50 mph). The same day at 15:00 UTC, Dawn made landfall near Cam Ranh as a tropical storm, with considerable wind shear affecting it, with an exposed low-level circulation. Dawn moved inland and quickly dissipated over northern Cambodia, with the JTWC and the JMA assessing that it had dissipated on November 20.

== Impacts ==
The combined effects of Dawn and cold weather from the north brought heavy rain to the provinces of Quang Binh, Khanh Hoa, and Tay Nguyen. 977 millimetres (38.5 in) of rain fell in A Lưới District. Communications were cut off by downpours in some areas, with stretches of Highway 1 being inundated in 3 feet (0.91 m) of water. A ship en route from Hong Kong to Malaysia with a crew of 22 had to abandon ship due to the storm off the coast of Phú Yên Province, with one person being killed and another 3 being injured. 432 thousand houses were flooded, with another 8 thousand collapsing. Many schools and hospitals were badly damaged, with 11 bridges and sluices being swept away. 30 thousand hectares of rice crops were waterlogged, with over 3 thousand farm animals being killed. 2 million people were displaced, and a total of 187 people were killed. Another 50 people were injured, and total losses were estimated at VND547.5 billion (US$39.3 million). Dawn was described as being the worst storm to hit Vietnam in 30 years. The floods were later worsened by Tropical Storm Elvis, which made landfall on the same area days later.

== See also ==
- 2020 Central Vietnam floods
