= Typhoon Dinah (1952) =

Pacific typhoon in 1952

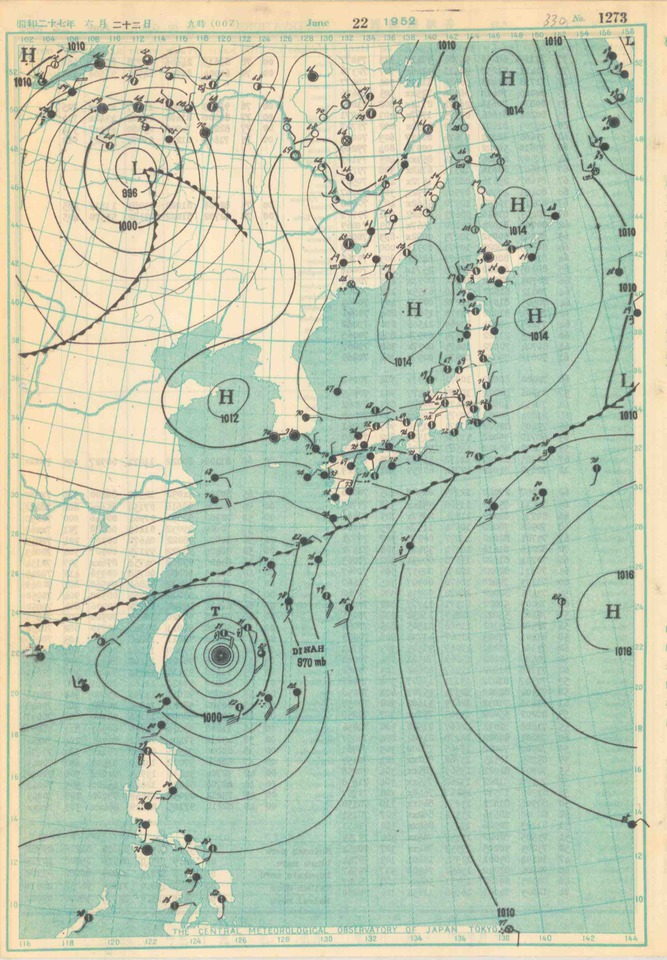
- This weather map on June 22 shows Dinah nearing peak intensity while located to the south of Japan.

Meteorological history
- Formed: June 19, 1952
- Extratropical: June 25
- Dissipated: June 26, 1952

Unknown-strength storm
- 10-minute sustained (JMA)
- Lowest pressure: 960 hPa (mbar); 28.35 inHg

Category 1-equivalent typhoon
- 1-minute sustained (SSHWS/JTWC)
- Highest winds: 140 km/h (85 mph)

Overall effects
- Fatalities: 65 confirmed
- Missing: 70
- Damage: Unknown
- Areas affected: Philippines, Taiwan, Japan
- Part of the 1952 Pacific typhoon season

Typhoon Dinah was a tropical cyclone that brought heavy damages to Japan, while leaving 65 fatalities and 70 to be missing, all in that country alone. It is also one of the disasters that happened in the country during the Showa 27 era. The second typhoon of the 1952 Pacific typhoon season, Dinah was first mentioned in weather maps as a tropical depression to the east of Visayas. It gradually organized, becoming a tropical storm on June 21 as it skirted the northeastern Philippines, with the Fleet Weather Center naming it Dinah. It strengthened further to a minimal typhoon as it moved through the Nansei Islands on June 22, before reaching its peak intensity of 140 km/h (85 mph), as estimated by the Fleet Center. It then weakened shortly, before passing near Shikoku on the next day, then making landfall through the southern part of the Kii Peninsula before gradually weakened further and started to undergo extratropical transition as it moved out of the country on June 24. It then became fully extratropical on the next day.

== Meteorological history ==
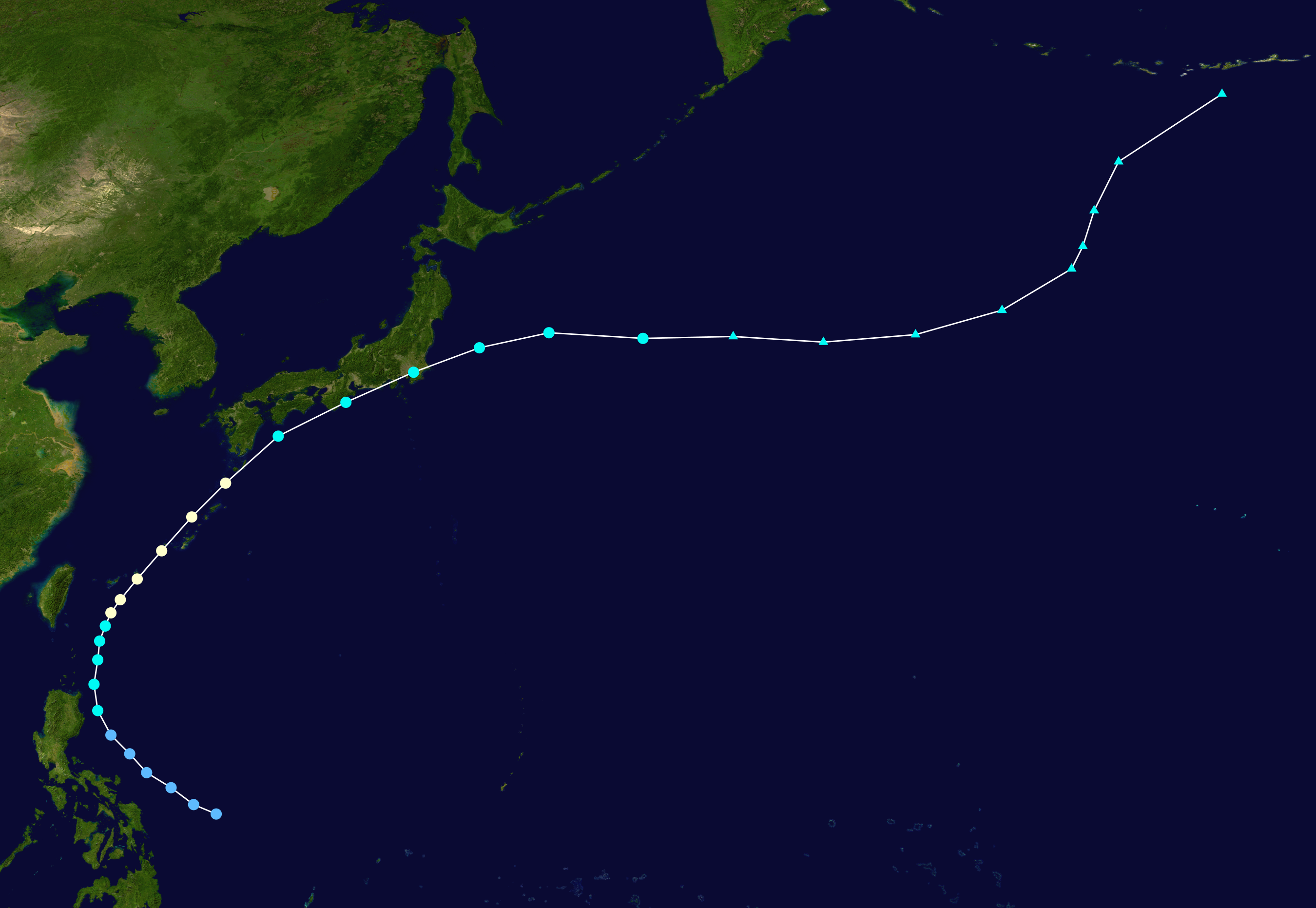
Map plotting the storm's track and intensity, according to the Saffir–Simpson scale Map key Saffir–Simpson scale Tropical depression (≤38 mph, ≤62 km/h) Tropical storm (39–73 mph, 63–118 km/h) Category 1 (74–95 mph, 119–153 km/h) Category 2 (96–110 mph, 154–177 km/h) Category 3 (111–129 mph, 178–208 km/h) Category 4 (130–156 mph, 209–251 km/h) Category 5 (≥157 mph, ≥252 km/h) Unknown Storm type Tropical cyclone Subtropical cyclone Extratropical cyclone, remnant low, tropical disturbance, or monsoon depression

On 00:00 UTC of June 19, both the Fleet Weather Center of Guam and China Meteorological Agency started to monitor a tropical depression that developed in the Philippine Sea to the east of Visayas in the Philippines. It has a pressure of 1006 mbar at that time. It started to move towards the northwest, rounding a ridge of high-pressure. It remained a tropical depression while nearing the coastline of Quezon and roughly 3 hours later, the CMA upgraded the system to a tropical storm near Cagayan Province; however, the Fleet Center didn't followed suit until on 12:00 UTC of the next day. The former provided the name Dinah on the intensifying system. This time, it moved to the north with its closest approach to the country is estimated at 250 km to the northeast of Santa Ana, Cagayan. It started to slowly intensify, while nearing the coast of Taiwan. On 18:00 UTC of June 22, both the Fleet Center upgraded the system to a minimal typhoon, as it started to curve towards the northwest. The CMA also upgraded the system, three hours later. Also at this time, Dinah passed through the Nansei Islands, while at peak intensity of 120 km/h (75 mph) and a minimum barometric pressure of 960 mbar; however, the CMA had a higher estimates of 160 km/h (100 mph), equivalent to a Category 2 typhoon. Shortly after its peak, Dinah started to weaken, being downgraded to a tropical storm by the Fleet Center and CMA on 15:00 and 21:00 UTC of the same day, respectively. On the next day, the storm started to interact with Japan as it moved to the northeast, passing near Shikoku before making landfall through the southern part of Kii Peninsula on 20:00 UTC. 3 hours later, Dinah passed to the Kumano Sea, before crossing the coast near Lake Hamana in Shizuoka Prefecture. Early the next day, it passed near Tokyo before moving out to the Pacific Ocean on the afternoon, just before starting its extratropical transition. It began to move to the east at this time, and on 15:00 UTC of June 25, it fully became extratropical, far west of Hawaii. The system began to accelerate to the north, until it was last noted on 18:00 UTC of the next day.

== Impact ==
=== Philippines ===
As Dinah skirted the northeastern part of the country, streets near its capital Manila were submerged in one-to-two feet of floodwaters. Due to the sparse coverage of the typhoon, the exact damages, fatalities and the aftermath were unknown.

=== Japan ===
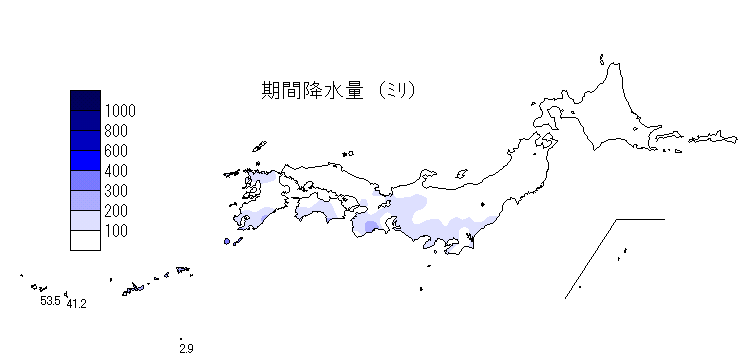
Rain accumulations in western Japan from Dinah

Despite Dinah, not a typhoon when it approached the Japanese islands, its effects were significant. Irozaki in Shizuoka Prefecture recorded the highest instantaneous wind speed of 48.6 meters per second, while Omaezaki recorded the highest instantaneous wind speed of 43.8 meters per second, all on June 23. In some areas, such as southern Kyushu, eastern Shikoku, the Kii Peninsula, and Izu Peninsula, rainfalls reached 200-350 mm. Thus, typhoon heavily damaged areas west of Kanto, mainly in Shizuoka Prefecture. The short rainfall in Tokushima Prefecture was between 100 and 200 mm and the hourly rainfall in its city was 55.8 mm, which was June's highest record.

A total of 65 individuals were killed, mainly due to the landslides induced by heavy rainfall from the storm. A huge mudslide trapped 53 persons at it; however, 42 were rescued by authorities and the other 11 was declared dead. In Fukui Prefecture, another landslide wiped out a house, leaving 9 dead. Nearly 13,000 acres of farmland were also destroyed by flash floods and over 25,000 households and wards were also damaged and/or flooded. The typhoon was later declared a significant disaster to the country.

== See also ==
- Typhoon Ida (1945) – also called in Japan as the Makurazaki Typhoon.
- Typhoon Marie (1954) – also called in Japan as the Tōya Maru Typhoon.
- Typhoon Sarah (1959) – also called in Japan as the Miyakojima Typhoon.
