= List of storms named Doreen =

The name Doreen has been used for five tropical cyclones in the East Pacific Ocean:

- Hurricane Doreen (1962)
- Tropical Storm Doreen (1965)
- Hurricane Doreen (1969)
- Hurricane Doreen (1973)
- Hurricane Doreen (1977)

== See also ==
- Cyclone Dorina (1995) – a South-West Indian Ocean tropical cyclone with a similar name
