= List of storms named Denise =

The name Denise has been used for four tropical cyclones worldwide, three in the Eastern Pacific Ocean and one in the South-West Indian Ocean. It also has been used in one European windstorm.

- Tropical Storm Denise (1967), weak tropical storm that never threatened land
- Hurricane Denise (1971), Category 4 hurricane that remained in the open ocean
- Hurricane Denise (1975), Category 4 hurricane that did not come near land

In the South-West Indian Ocean:

- Tropical Cyclone Denise (1966), passed north of Mauritius and then crossed over Réunion

In Europe:

- Storm Denise (2022)
