= Cyclone Dinah =

Category 4 South Pacific and Australian region cyclone in 1967

Severe Tropical Cyclone Dinah
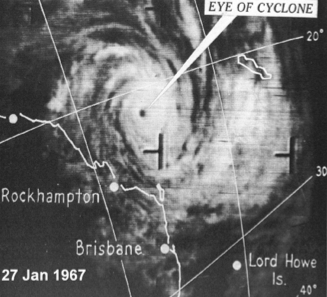
- Satellite image of Cyclone Dinah on 27 January

Meteorological history
- Formed: 22 January 1967
- Dissipated: 3 February 1967

Category 4 severe tropical cyclone
- 10-minute sustained (BOM)
- Highest winds: 195 km/h (120 mph)
- Lowest pressure: 944.8 hPa (mbar); 27.90 inHg

Category 2-equivalent tropical cyclone
- 1-minute sustained (SSHWS/JTWC)
- Highest winds: 155 km/h (100 mph)

Overall effects
- Fatalities: 1 total
- Missing: 1
- Damage: Severe
- Areas affected: Queensland, New South Wales, New Zealand
- Part of the 1966–67 South Pacific and Australian region cyclone seasons

Severe Tropical Cyclone Dinah was an intense tropical cyclone that impacted the southern coasts of Queensland and New South Wales, causing floods and landslides in 1967. It was regarded by an official in the Bureau of Meteorology's Brisbane Tropical Cyclone Warning Centre as the strongest storm to approach the southern coasts of Queensland since reliable records began. Forming on 22 January in the South Pacific basin, nearly 620 kilometers to the southeast of Honiara in the Solomon Islands, the disturbance that would eventually be Dinah remained disorganized until the next day when the system started to organize under the warm waters of the Coral Sea. On 24 January, the disturbance was upgraded to a tropical cyclone by the BoM and was named Dinah, being the fifth storm in the records of the meteorology center of Australia in the 1966–67 Australian region cyclone season. Environmental conditions favoured Dinah to further intensify, becoming a severe tropical cyclone on 27 January while recurving south-southwestwards. On the next day, it passed through the Great Barrier Reef as a Category 4 severe tropical cyclone before passing through Fraser Island on 29 January, where the Sandy Cape Lighthouse recorded a minimum barometric pressure of 944.8 hPa on Dinah, being the lowest known pressure of the system. It then battered the whole island before turning south-southeastwards, away from the coast of Queensland. Weakening took place while slowing down, passing near Lord Howe Island as a Category 2 tropical cyclone before undergoing extratropical transition on 31 January. Dinah became extratropical on the night of that day before accelerating eastward, approaching New Zealand. The system then turned southeastward for the final time before passing through the North Island. It reemerged on the Southern Pacific Ocean on 3 February, where it dissipated.

According to a study, Dinah caused the largest waves observed in southern Queensland in centuries. The system also inflicted extensive damage on Heron Island during its passage to the southern part of the state, starting with the flooding of massive north-easterly swellings and a day later with heavy winds. Although Dinah remained offshore, its outer rainbands caused heavy rains and gusty winds that uprooted trees, starting from Rockhampton Region to Grafton in New South Wales. Some residential institutions lost their roofs due to the wind, while banana and sugarcane crops were destroyed and inundated by floodwaters. Severe erosions were reported in Emu Park and Maryborough-Bundaberg areas. Massive rainfall amounts were recorded in some parts of Queensland, New South Wales and New Zealand's North Island as the extratropical remnant. Storm surges were also seen on Sunshine Coast, Queensland. Tourists on Lord Howe Island were stranded by the storm, while many residents had to be rescued on different beaches due to large swells. A man in North Island in New Zealand was feared drowned due to Dinah, while another was missing due to his car being submerged in floods. The damage was described as severe, but the numerical amounts were unknown.

== Meteorological history ==
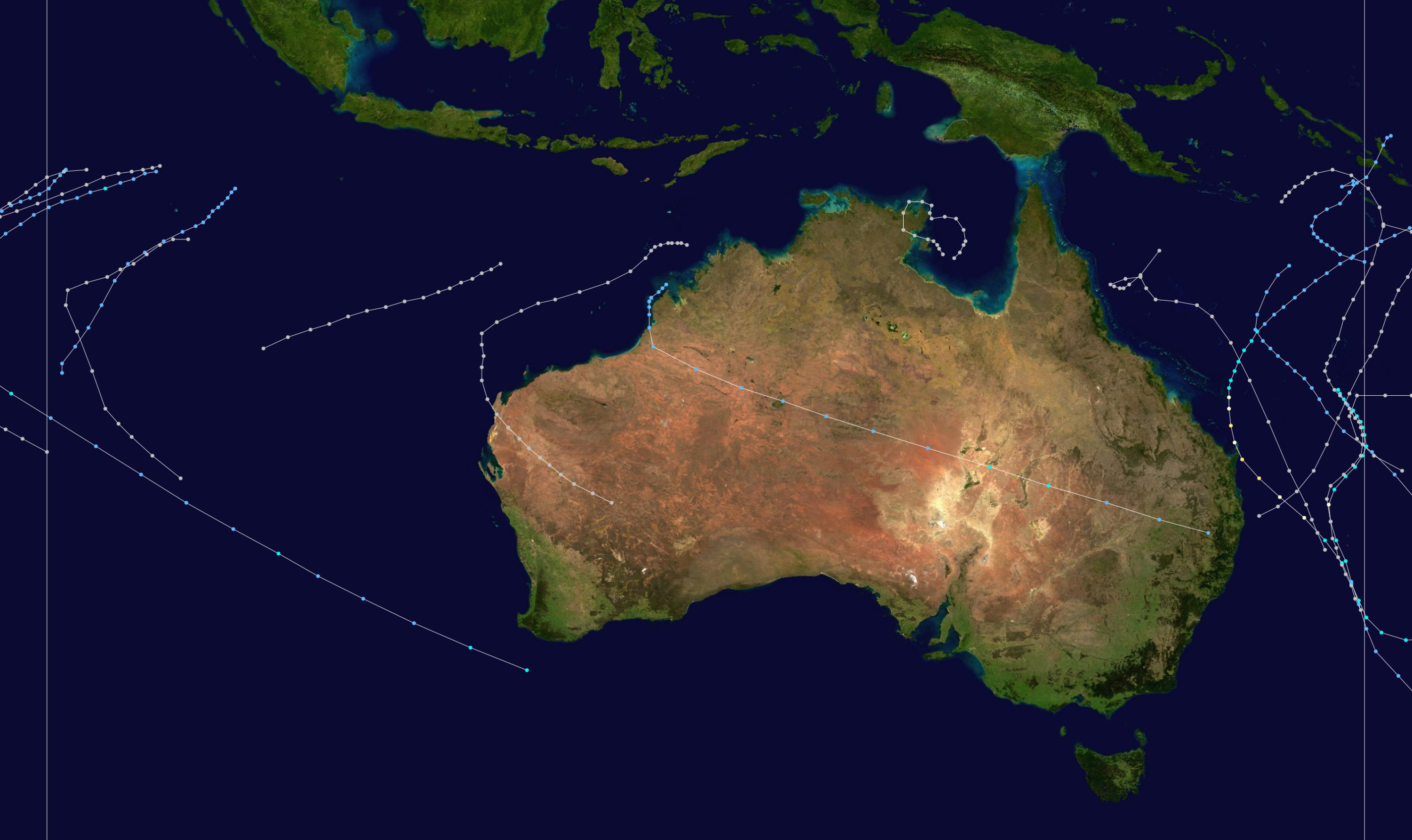
The summary of the 1966–67 Australian region cyclone season.

Dinah was first noted as a tropical low on 23:00 UTC on 22 January in the adjacent South Pacific basin, nearly 168 kilometers to the south-southwest of Lata, Solomon Islands. In the early stages of its life, the disturbance moved west-southwestwards while remaining weak, possibly due to its unfavorable environment. More recent study about the track of the storm showed that the precursor to Dinah developed on 08:00 UTC that day, north-northwest of Vanuatu. Over the next hours, the system moved southwestwards while becoming organized; however, the observations of the low remained scarce due to the lack of weather stations in the area. The best track of the storm from the Joint Typhoon Warning Centre revealed that the agency started to monitor the developing system in their Significant Tropical Weather Outlooks on 12:00 UTC on 22 January, estimating the wind speeds of the system to be at 15 knots. Nevertheless, the disturbance organised further and on 24 January, the organisation of the low became enough for the Bureau of Meteorology's (BoM) Tropical Cyclone Warning Centre in Brisbane to name the system Dinah as it entered the Area of Responsibility (AoR) of Queensland's capital. Two days later, the JTWC upgraded the system to a tropical storm on the modern-day Saffir–Simpson scale. Under the warm waters of the Coral Sea, Dinah started to slowly intensify, although its motion slowed down again. At 11:00 UTC of 25 January, the Brisbane TCWC upgraded the system to a Category 2 tropical cyclone as Dinah's eye started to emerge. Continuing its southwestward motion, Dinah continued to strengthen, as conditions in the Coral Bay favored the system to organize. At 23:00 UTC on 26 January, the TCWC Brisbane further upgraded the system to a Category 3 severe tropical cyclone, as its eye became well-defined and the system became more compact in size, while located nearly 612 kilometers to the east-northeast of Bowen, Queensland. Dinah began to curve south-southwestwards, approaching the southern coasts of Queensland while reaching its peak intensity of 195 km/h (121 mph), making it a Category 4 severe tropical cyclone. The cyclone then brushed the southern portion of the Great Barrier Reef, starting from Halfmoon Reef on 27 January and Gater Reef, Sweetlip Reef and the Hixson Reefs on 28 January before exiting the area. On the next day, while nearing the coast of Queensland, it made landfall on Fraser Island between 05:00 and 06:30 UTC that day, first on Sandy Cape where its lighthouse recorded a barometric pressure of 944.8 hPa (27.9 inHg), being the lowest known pressure of Dinah. It turned south-southeastwards, reemerging on the Coral Bay before making a second landfall, west of Waddy Point that day before moving on to the said bay, before slowing down again for the third time. The eye of Dinah became cloud-filled as it moved away from the coast of Queensland, although it remained in that intensity until it was downgraded to a Category 3 severe tropical cyclone at 11:00 UTC on 30 January. Further weakening took place as Dinah started to enter an unfavorable environment and 12 hours later, Dinah became a Category 2 tropical cyclone as it passed near Lord Howe Island before undergoing extratropical transition as it interacted with the jet stream. It then fully became extratropical on the next day, on the Tasman Sea. Ex-Dinah then brushed North Island on 2 February before emerging on the South Pacific Ocean by the next day, where it dissipated.

== Preparations and impact ==
=== Queensland and New South Wales ===
On 30 January, a flood warning was raised on the same day on the areas surrounding the Brunswick, Tweed and Richmond rivers. A spokesman for the Civil Defense Force on the NSW said that the regional defense forces on the state alerted the residents living on the coast for possible impacts. The Civil Defence authorities in New South Wales were on Standby Alert starting on 31 January, following Dinah. Dinah is described as the strongest tropical cyclone to reach the southern coastal waters of Queensland, according to the regional director of Bureau of Meteorology Brisbane TCWC, A. Shields. Winds up to 200 mph were reported by the meteorological stations in Sandy Cape. A wind gust of 48 mph was recorded at Sydney. Dinah also affected shipping operations. The storm also left large swaths of Brisbane submerged on two-foot floodwaters. A house was washed away on Cribb Island, while the Wintergarden Theatre in Bundaberg lost its roof due to strong winds. A 50-foot yacht sustained damages while being docked in Heron Island due to giant waves caused by Dinah. The heaviest rain accumulation from the cyclone was recorded at Bundaberg on 29 January, at 292.1 mm.

A wave caused by Cyclone Dinah caused an injury to Samuel Perry, a baker on the passenger ship Triaster. He suffered a fracture on his right arm and a dislocated shoulder. Adding on, the bakery and the galley of the ship were flooded due to the storm's large waves. Two rescuers almost drowned as they attempted to save a man who was swimming on Coolangatta Beach on 31 January. The latter was further saved, according to reports. Francis Chichester, a sailor was stranded from the high waves caused by Dinah. He was heading from Sydney to the southernmost tip of New Zealand when he started to experience the brunt of the cyclone. Chichester, however, survived the storm. The town of Tocumwal suffered damages to trees, fields, and buildings. The area was also without power, starting on 29 January. A part of the roofing at the Lady Maryborough Hospital, located in Maryborough, was downed and flown away by the strong winds caused by the storm, resulting in the patients being transferred to other hospitals. The mayor of the Gold Coast in Queensland instructed their city council to prepare for emergencies following the cyclone. At Heron Island, the large trees in the area were snapped by strong winds from Dinah. A Brisbane spokesman said that the telephone lines in the area were downed, north and south of Maryborough. In addition, buildings in Brisbane suffered roof damages. Storm surges also inundated sugarcane crops in Sunshine Coast.

The roadways in Grafton are submerged in floodwaters following Dinah. One man is believed to be drowned due to the floods, according to authorities. He is identified as 52-year old Allan James Gillard, which was feared drowned in his car at Ross Creek, 30 miles to the west of Buccarumbi. Eighteen students of the Canberra Grammar School were rescued on 30 January after an accident when their rowing eights were inundated. They were rescued by police nearby and the head of the said school. 4 tourists of the were stranded due to Dinah, with 41 of them wanting to leave the area since that day, but are advised to stay due to the rough conditions caused by the storm. The Japanese bulk coal carrier Yoho Maru and Dutch freighter Sigli experienced the impact of the cyclone, but they managed to escape. The extratropical remnants of Dinah, while heading to Sydney, impacted a British liner while on the Tasman Sea. Himalaya, en route from New Zealand to the capital of New South Wales, experienced the brunt of the former Cyclone Dinah. 14 were injured, with two of them being badly affected. The damages were described as severe, but the numerical amounts were unknown. However, Dinah caused a beneficial rainfall to some crops in Fairymead, a locality in Queensland.

=== New Zealand ===
The Meteorological Service of New Zealand forecasts that the extratropical remnants of Dinah will bring heavy rainfall and gale-force winds.

The extratropical remnants of Dinah caused torrential rainfall and gale-force winds in the North Island of New Zealand. A hailstorm was reported in the city of Nelson; however, no deaths were reported. A man was reported missing in Rotorua; he was presumed drowned. Flight operations were affected on 2 February, while some areas in the North Island experienced power outages. A bridge was swept away in Ahipara, while rockslides were reported in Helena Bay. The town of Dargaville recorded a rain accumulation of 3.72 in (9.4 cm) on 2 February, while Fairburn and Kaikohe reported 4.4 in (11 cm) of rain on the same day and 3 February, respectively. Kaitaia reported a rain amount of 5.2 in (13 cm) on the former date, while the metropolitan city of Auckland in the Northern Island recorded a rainfall total of 4.5 in (11 cm). Some animals died in the floods at Waikato while levees at Huntly recorded damages. The State Highways were flooded and reported significant damages throughout the island. The Waioeka Gorge highway sustained serious damage, which cost an estimated $150,000 (1963 NZD) for repair. A state of emergency was declared at the town of Whakatāne on 3 February, while 28 individuals in the area were evacuated. In the region of Manawatū-Whanganui, gardens were destroyed by high winds and telephone lines were down. The damages from the roads in the area were at £ 5,000. Mangahoe station in the area recorded the highest rainfall amount in the country, standing at 321 mm (32.1 cm) on an unknown date.

== Retirement ==
As Dinah caused immense destruction throughout Australia, the BoM retired it from its naming list.

== See also ==
- Cyclone Ada
- Cyclone Althea
