= List of storms named Danny =

The name Danny has been used for seven tropical cyclones in the Atlantic Ocean, replacing David on the naming lists:

- Hurricane Danny (1985) – caused widespread flooding in Louisiana, killing 5 and causing $100 million in damage.
- Tropical Storm Danny (1991) – formed near Cape Verde but dissipated before threatening land.
- Hurricane Danny (1997) – struck Louisiana and Alabama; tracked across the southeastern United States and ultimately affected parts of New England with rain and wind; killed nine and caused $100 million in damage (1997 USD).
- Hurricane Danny (2003) – looped in open ocean, never threatened land.
- Tropical Storm Danny (2009) – formed as a tropical storm east of the Bahamas, skipping depression status; later absorbed by a frontal system off the US East Coast.
- Hurricane Danny (2015) – a small Category 3 hurricane that approached the Leeward Islands but dissipated before threatening land.
- Tropical Storm Danny (2021) – formed shortly before making landfall in South Carolina.
