= Doria =

Doria or Dória may refer to:

== People ==
=== Surname ===
- Doria (family), a prominent Genoese family
  - Andrea Doria (1466–1560), Genoese admiral
  - Ansaldo Doria, 12th century Genoese statesman and commander
  - Brancaleone Doria (died c. 1409?), husband of Eleanor of Arborea and conqueror of most of Sardinia
  - Giovanni Doria (bishop) (1573–1642), Roman Catholic cardinal and Archbishop of Palermo
  - Giovanni Andrea Doria (1539–1606), Italian admiral also known as Gianandrea Doria
  - Giovanni Battista Doria (1470–1554), Doge of the Republic of Genoa
  - Giovanni Carlo Doria (1576–1625), Genoese art collector
  - Lamba Doria (1245–1323), Genoese admiral
  - Marco Doria, Marquis and Count of Montaldeo (born 1957), Italian academic and politician, former mayor of Genoa
  - Oberto Doria (died 1306), Genoese politician and admiral
  - Paganino Doria, 14th century Genoese admiral
  - Perceval Doria (c. 1195–1264), Genoese naval and military leader
  - Simon Doria (fl. 1250–1293), Genoese statesman and man of letters
  - Simone Doria (admiral) (c. 1135–?), Genoese merchant, politician and admiral
  - Sinibaldo Doria (1664–1733), archbishop and cardinal
- Armand Doria (1824–1896), French count, art collector and patron
- Giacomo Doria (1840–1913), Italian naturalist, herpetologist, and politician
- João Doria (born 1957), Brazilian politician
- Jorge Dória (1920–2013), Brazilian actor and humourist
- Marina Doria
- Palmério Dória (1948–2023), Brazilian journalist and writer
- René Ricolfi-Doria

=== Mononym and given name ===
- Dória (Matheus Dória Macedo, born 1994), Brazilian footballer for Olympique de Marseille and Brazil
- Doria Ragland, American social worker, yoga instructor, and mother of Meghan, Duchess of Sussex
- Doria Shafik, Egyptian feminist
- Doria Tillier (born 1986) French actress

== Other uses ==
- Doria (food), a Japanese dish similar to gratin but with a rice base
- Doria (opera), a French opera based on life of Andrea Doria by composer Étienne Méhul that premiered in 1795
- Doria, a synonym for the fly genus Compsilura
- List of storms named Doria, Atlantic Ocean tropical cyclones
- Doria, one of the seven Magypsies in the video game Mother 3

== See also ==
- Dorian (disambiguation)
- Dorriyeh, a village in Syria
