= Oriana =

Female name

Oriana is a given name meaning 'gold, sunrise, or dawn'. Variants include Orianna, Oriane or Orianne.

Sometimes Orian, Orestes or Dorian may be a male given name or a family name, as Orians, Oriani, or Doria.

== Possible roots of the name ==
There is the Latin meaning of rising (as in sunrise; see a similar word root in Orient).

Things get even more complicated as in the languages of the Iberian Peninsula, namely Spanish and Portuguese, there is the medieval Oroana or Ouroana, from Oro or Ouro meaning Gold, whose origin is the Latin Aurum, and whose root, Aur, may be related to Ori.

The Irish version of this name means ' the golden one' and stems from 'Ór' which is the Irish for gold.

== Notable people ==
Notable people with the name include:

- Nickname for English queen Elizabeth I; the Oriana madrigals were written for her.
- Oriana Wilson (1876–1945), MBE, British humanitarian and wife of explorer Edward Adrian Wilson
- Oriana Fallaci (1929–2006), Italian journalist, author, political
- Oriana Clare Tickell, Dame Clare Tickell
- Oriana Panozzo, Australian actress
- Oriana Scheuss, Swiss Olympic sport shooter
- Oriana Civile, Sicilian folk singer and ethnomusicologist
- Oriana Small, birth name of Ashley Blue, US actress
- Oriane Lassus (born 1987), author, cartoonist, illustrator
- Oriana Sabatini, Argentine actress, model and singer
- Oriana Skylar Mastro, American political scientist

=== Fictional characters ===
- Oriana, heiress to the throne of Great Britain and beloved of Amadis de Gaula, in Oriana by Garci Rodríguez de Montalvo
- Oriana, fairy and main character in the children's book A Fada Oriana, by Portuguese writer Sophia de Mello Breyner Andresen
- Oriane de Guermantes, Duchesse de Guermantes, character in Marcel Proust's novel In Search of Lost Time
- Oriana, the princess whom the protagonist of Felix the Cat: The Movie must save, as well as the name of the land she rules over
- Orianna, the daughter of Talon and Oria in the metal opera Days of Rising Doom by Aina
- Oureana, Moorish princess who converted to Christianity in 12th-century Portugal
- Oriane, a character in the novel Labyrinth by Kate Mosse
- Orianna, The Lady of Clockwork, a character in the video game League of Legends
- Oriana, genetic twin of Miranda Lawson in the video game Mass Effect 2
- Oriana, subject of the poem by the same name by Alfred, Lord Tennyson
- Orianna Spearling, a character in the novel The Walls Around Us by Nova Ren Suma
- Oriana de la Force, a villainous lawyer in the book series Conspiracy 365 by Gabrielle Lord
- Orianna, a higher vampire in The Witcher 3: Wild Hunt – Blood and Wine
- Rose Oriana, the princess of the Midgar kingdom, a character in the TV show, manga and light novel The Eminence in Shadow

== Ships ==
- SS Oriana (1959), former ocean liner
- MV Oriana (1995), former cruise ship

== Other ==
- "The Ballad of Oriana", 1830 poem by Alfred Tennyson
- Oriana. Una donna, a 2013 biography of Oriana Fallaci
