= List of storms named Doria =

The name Doria has been used for two tropical cyclones in the Atlantic Ocean:

- Hurricane Doria (1967) – a Category 2 hurricane that looped offshore of the East Coast of the United States
- Tropical Storm Doria (1971) – caused record-breaking precipitation in New Jersey

== See also ==
Storms with similar names

- Cyclone Daria (1990) – a European windstorm known as the Burns' Day Storm in the United Kingdom
- Cyclone Dorina (1995) – a South-West Indian Ocean intense tropical cyclone
