= 1994–95 Australian region cyclone season =

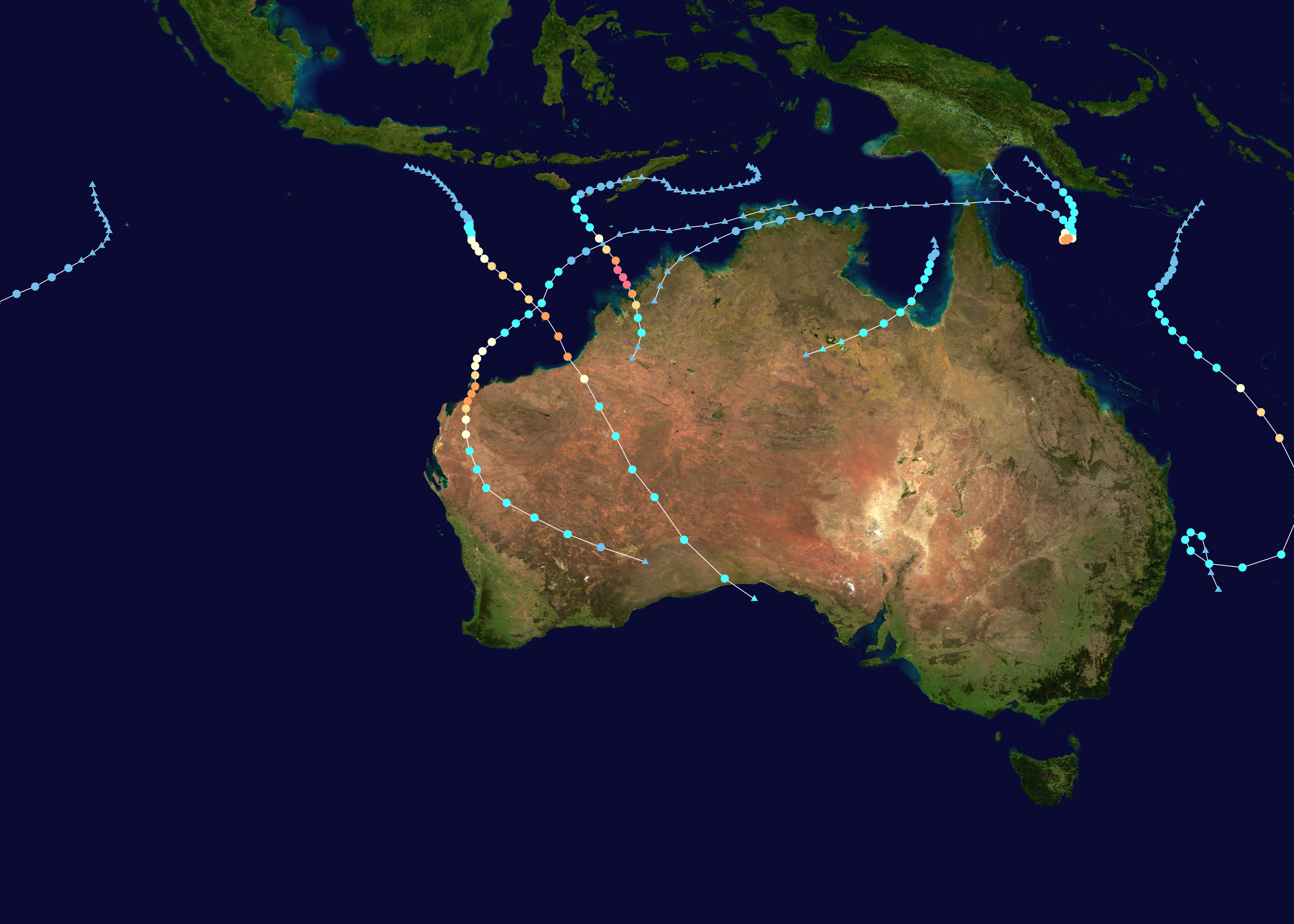
- Season summary map

Seasonal boundaries
- First system formed: 12 December 1994
- Last system dissipated: 23 April 1995

Strongest storm
- Name: Chloe
  - Maximum winds: 220 km/h (140 mph) (10-minute sustained)
  - Lowest pressure: 920 hPa (mbar)

Seasonal statistics
- Tropical lows: 19
- Tropical cyclones: 6
- Severe tropical cyclones: 6
- Total fatalities: 1
- Total damage: Unknown

Related articles
- 1994–95 South-West Indian Ocean cyclone season; 1994–95 South Pacific cyclone season

The 1994–95 Australian region cyclone season was a below average Australian cyclone season. It was also an event in the ongoing cycle of tropical cyclone formation. It ran from 1 November 1994 to 30 April 1995. The regional tropical cyclone operational plan also defines a tropical cyclone year separately from a tropical cyclone season, and the "tropical cyclone year" ran from 1 July 1994 to 30 June 1995.

Tropical cyclones in this area were monitored by four Tropical Cyclone Warning Centres (TCWCs): the Australian Bureau of Meteorology in Perth, Darwin, and Brisbane; and TCWC Port Moresby in Papua New Guinea.

== Systems ==
=== Severe Tropical Cyclone Annette ===
- Category 4 severe tropical cyclone (Australian scale)
- Category 3 tropical cyclone (SSHWS)
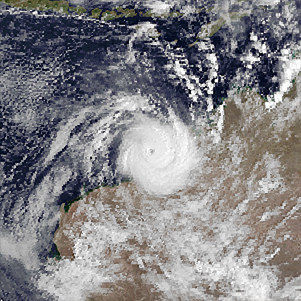
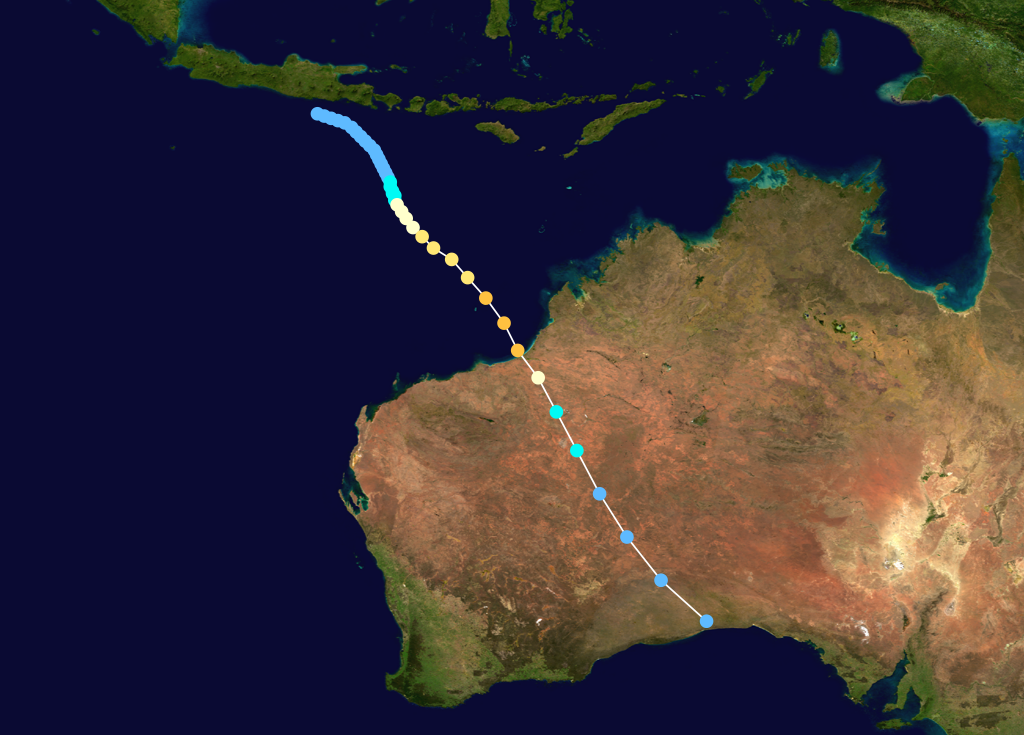
- Duration: 12 December – 20 December
- Peak intensity: 185 km/h (115 mph) (10-min); 925 hPa (mbar)

Annette formed on 12 December 1994. The storm moved southeastward while intensifying to a Category 4 cyclone. Annette made landfall at Mandora Station on 18 December. There was considerable damage to homes and crops and about 1,000 cattle were lost in the storm.

=== Tropical Low Heida ===
- Tropical low (Australian scale)
- Tropical depression (SSHWS)
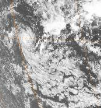
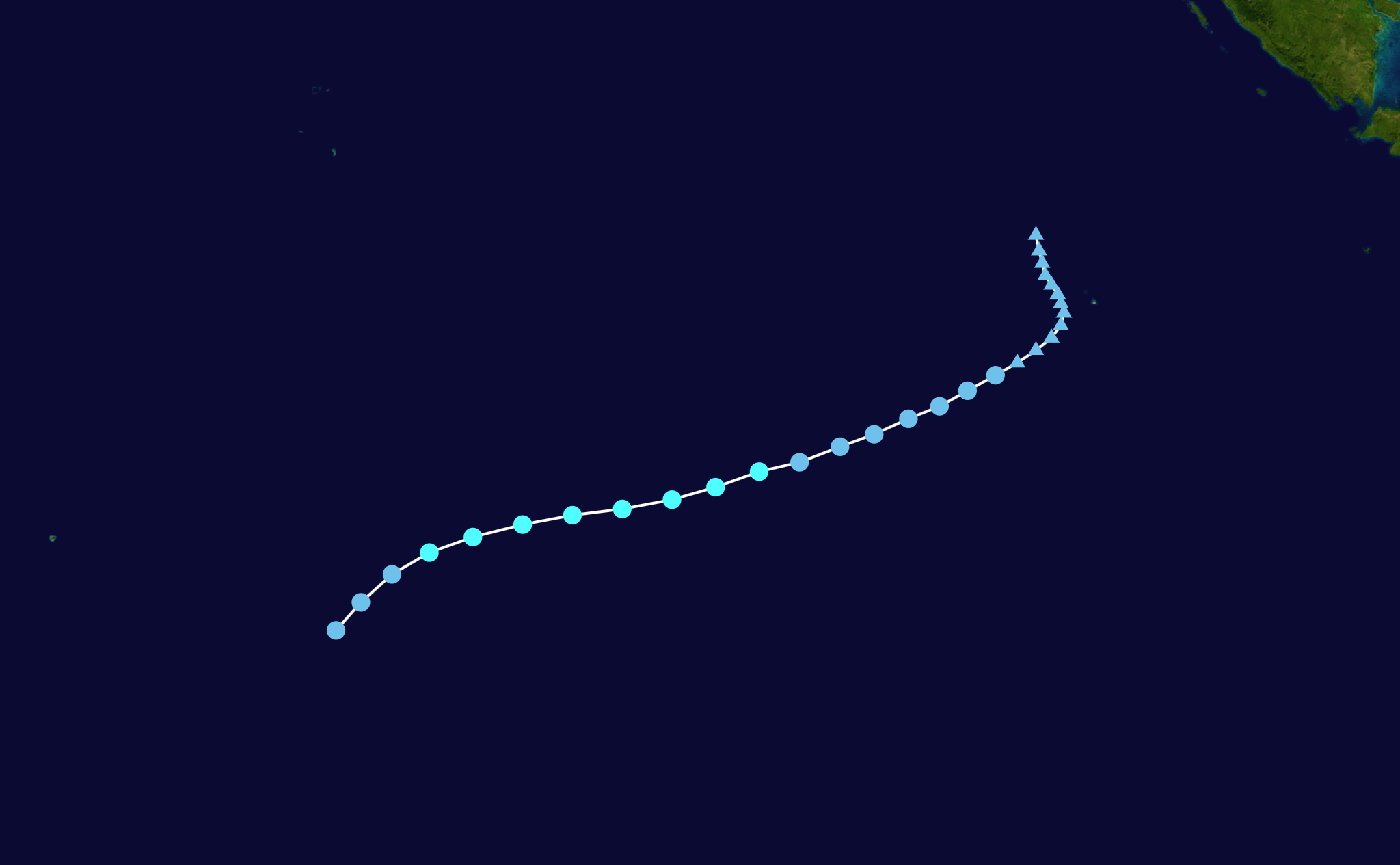
- Duration: 3 February – 4 February (Exited basin)
- Peak intensity: 55 km/h (35 mph) (10-min); 995 hPa (mbar)

Tropical Low Heida developed on 3 February and exited the basin on the next day.

=== Severe Tropical Cyclone Bobby ===
- Category 4 severe tropical cyclone (Australian scale)
- Category 3 tropical cyclone (SSHWS)
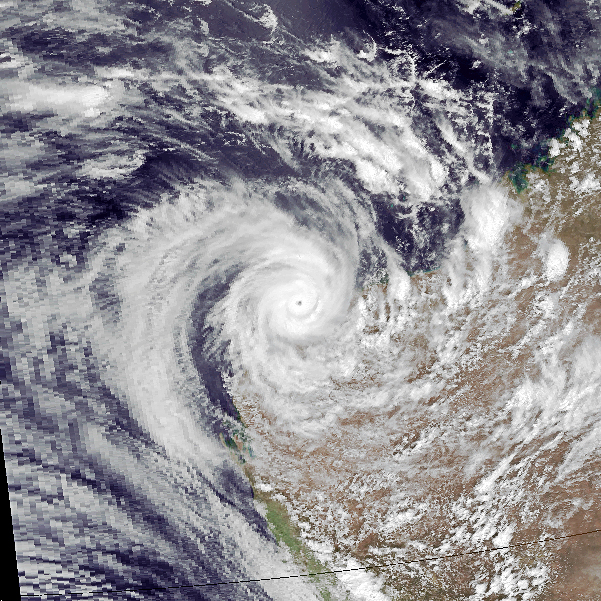
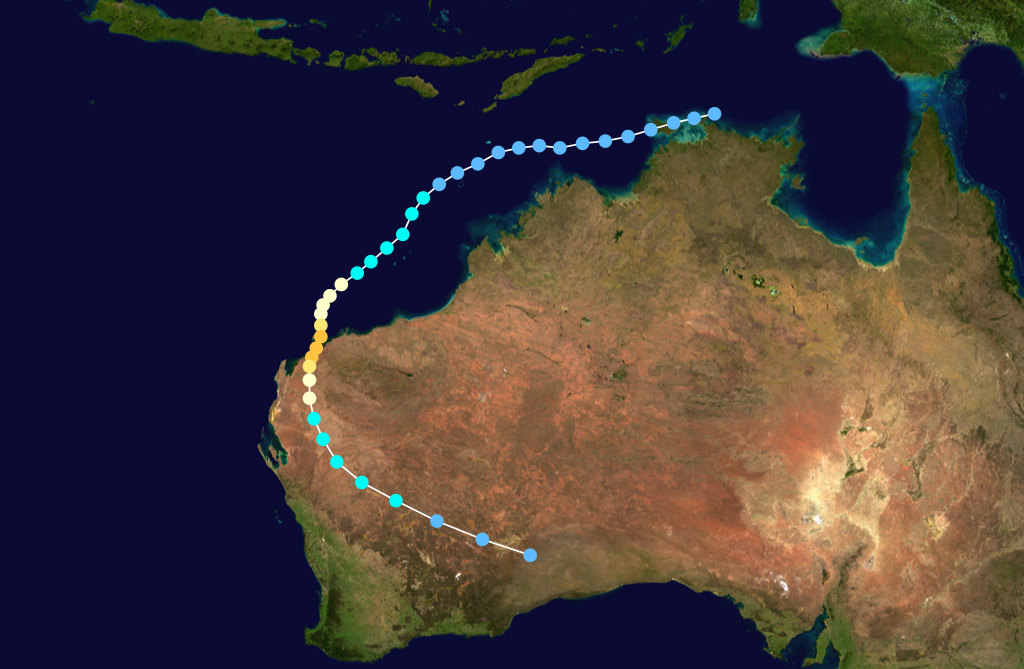
- Duration: 19 February – 27 February
- Peak intensity: 195 km/h (120 mph) (10-min); 925 hPa (mbar)

Severe Tropical Cyclone Bobby, a Category 4 cyclone with estimated winds up to 270 km/hour near the centre, crossed the Western Australian Pilbara coast to the east of Onslow between midnight and 0100 on the 25 February 1995. Seven people died when two fishing trawlers were sunk off the coast from Onslow. A bulk ore carrier also ran aground in the cyclone. There was very minor property damage reported from the Karratha area and approximately 20 houses in Onslow suffered superficial roofing damage. Cyclone Bobby also brought heavy rains and extensive flooding to the south of the Pilbara area, which damaged roads, bridges and crops and seriously affected mining production. A motorist was drowned inland from Carnarvon while attempting to cross a flooded creek.

=== Severe Tropical Cyclone Violet ===
- Category 3 severe tropical cyclone (Australian scale)
- Category 1 tropical cyclone (SSHWS)
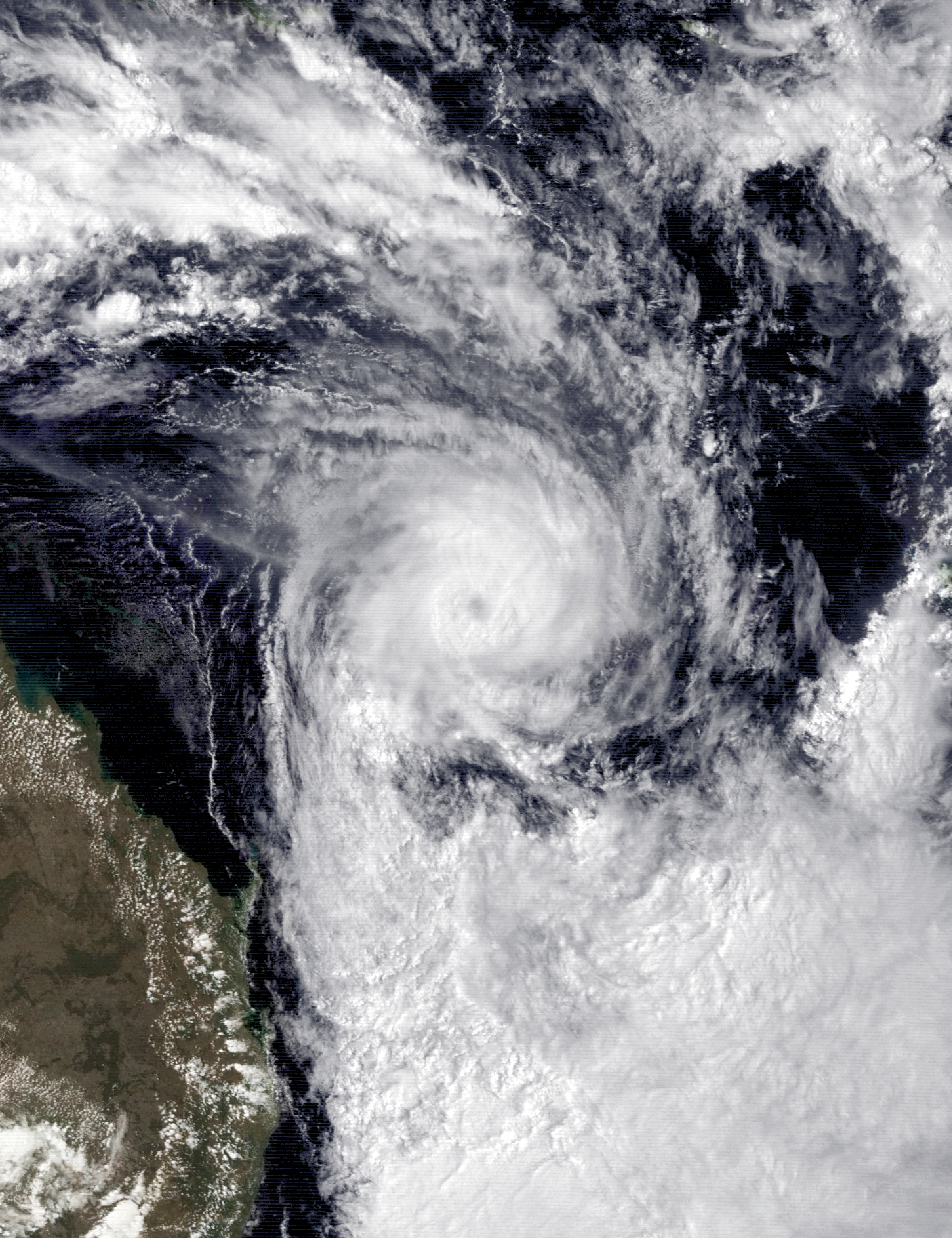
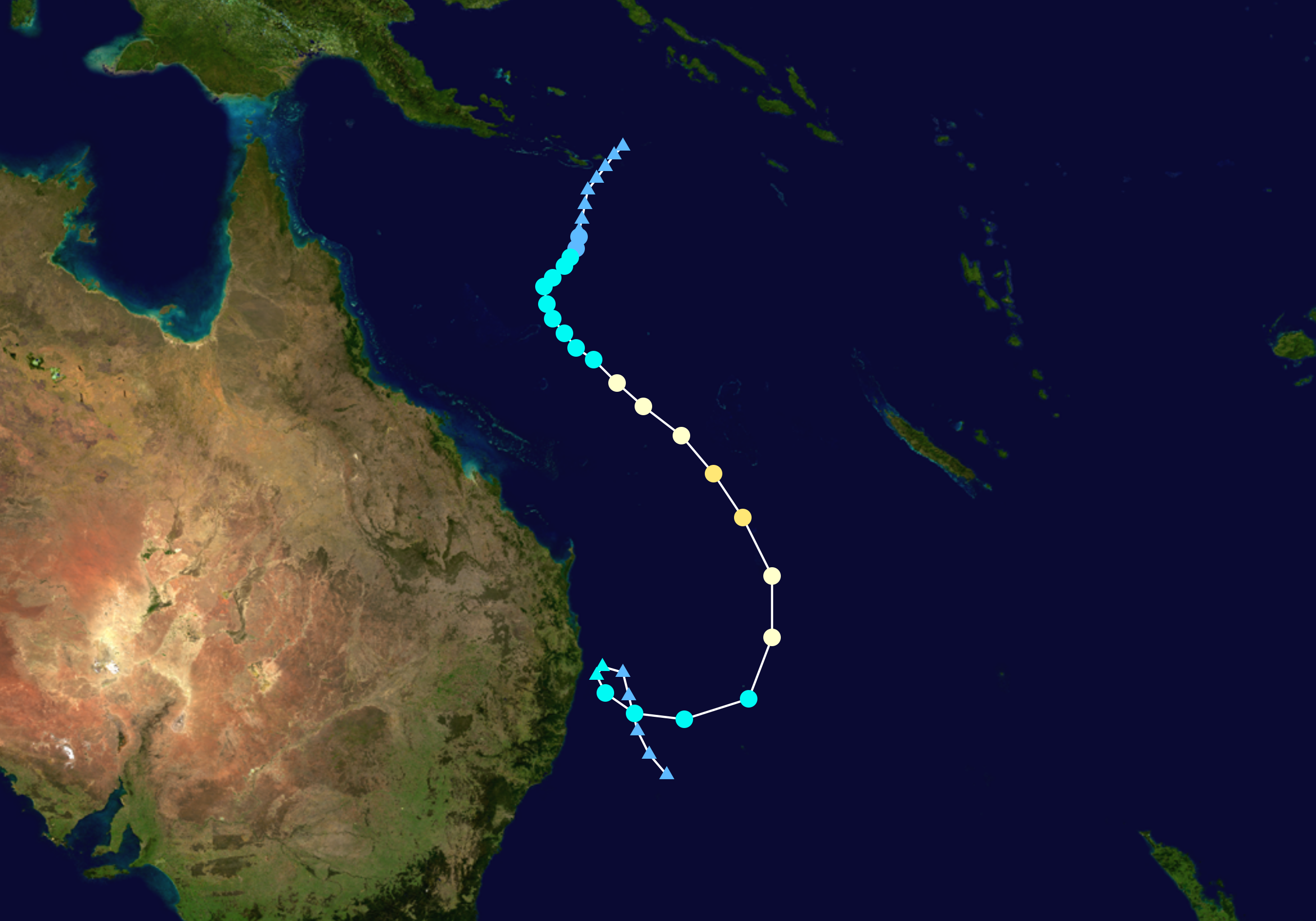
- Duration: 2 March – 8 March (Out of basin from 6 March)
- Peak intensity: 155 km/h (100 mph) (10-min); 960 hPa (mbar)

During the afternoon of 2 March a tropical low formed over the Coral Sea. The low moved south-westwards and proceeded to deepen, becoming a Category 1 Tropical Cyclone on 3 March, being named Violet. During the afternoon of 5 March, Violet turned south-eastwards and continued to intensify, up until its peak intensity of 150 km/h winds and a central pressure of 960 hPa as a Category 3 severe Tropical Cyclone. Violet then weakened slowly as it turned to a south-westwards direction during the evening of 6 March. During the next day, Violet began a transition into a deep extratropical low, with a central pressure of 980 hPa.

The low made its closest approach to the coast on the 7 March, passing 50 km off the northern New South Wales coast. The low proceeded to do a loop towards the southeast before dissipating on the 8 March. The only report of damage from Violet was beach erosion at Lord Howe Island and around northern New South Wales.

=== Severe Tropical Cyclone Warren ===
- Category 3 severe tropical cyclone (Australian scale)
- Tropical storm (SSHWS)
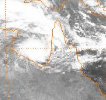
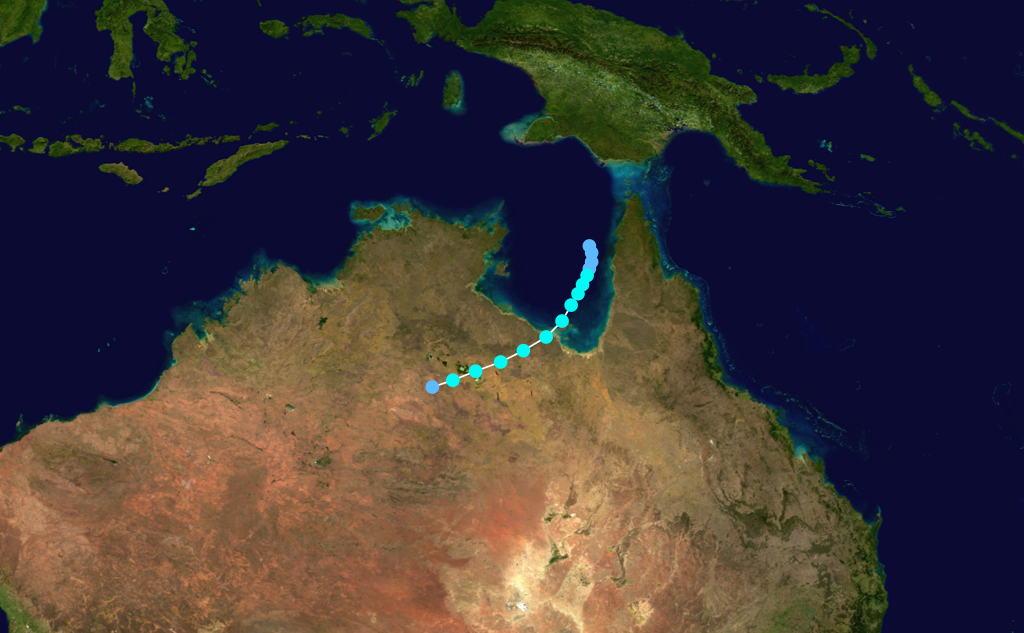
- Duration: 4 March – 7 March
- Peak intensity: 150 km/h (90 mph) (10-min); 960 hPa (mbar)

On 4 March a tropical low had developed in the Gulf of Carpentaria. The low proceeded to move southwards and started to intensify, quickly becoming a category 1 tropical cyclone later the same day, being named Warren. Warren then turned in a south-western direction and proceeded to rapidly intensify, reaching category 1 hurricane strength on the 5 March just north of Mornington Island on the 5 March. Warren reached peak intensity with mean winds of 140 Kilometers per Hour and a central pressure of 960 hPa 6 hours later. Warren made landfall near the southern coast of the Gulf of Carpentaria and weakened rapidly as it moved inland, eventually dissipating near the Queensland-Northern Territory border on the 6 March.

=== Severe Tropical Cyclone Chloe ===
- Category 5 severe tropical cyclone (Australian scale)
- Category 4 tropical cyclone (SSHWS)
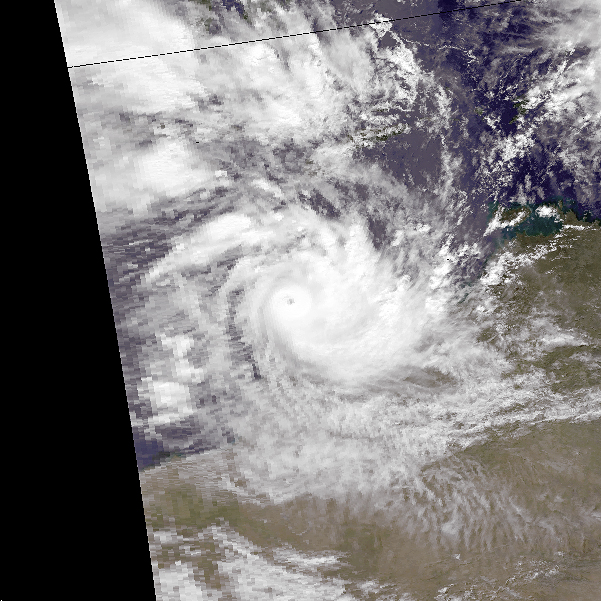
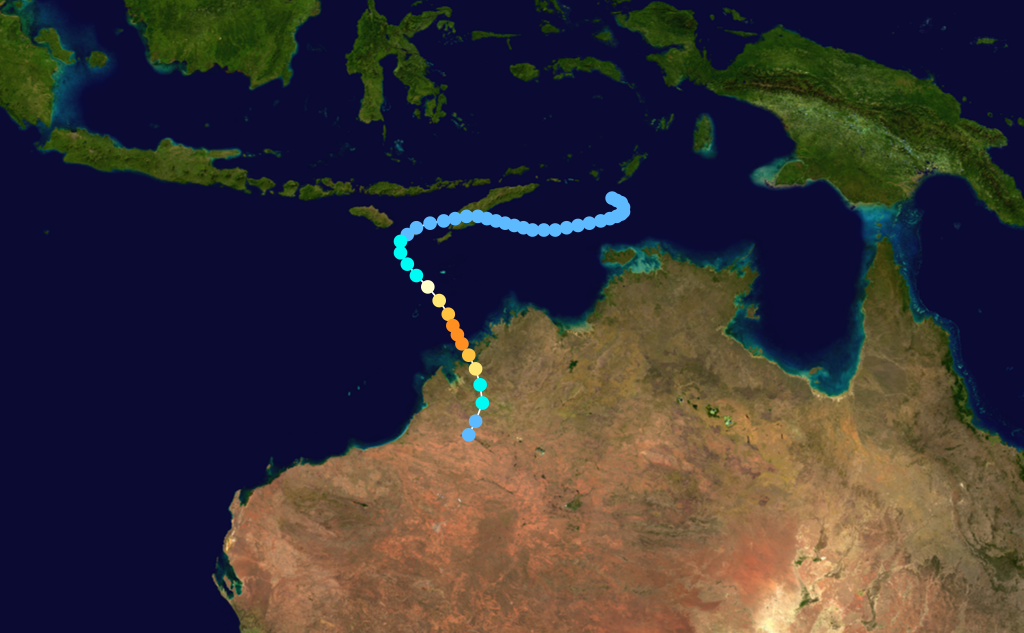
- Duration: 3 April – 9 April
- Peak intensity: 220 km/h (140 mph) (10-min); 920 hPa (mbar)

The third major cyclone to strike Australia in the season, Severe Tropical Cyclone Chloe reached a peak intensity of Category 5, before weakening slightly to Category 4 prior to making landfall in the uninhabited section of the coast of the Kimberley region of Western Australia on 7 April 1995. The storm dissipated well inland.

=== Tropical Depression 20S ===
- Tropical depression (SSHWS)
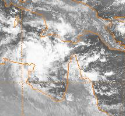
- Duration: 1 April – 6 April
- Peak intensity: 45 km/h (30 mph) (1-min); 1004 hPa (mbar)

Tropical Depression 20S existed from 1 April to 6 April.

=== Severe Tropical Cyclone Agnes ===
- Category 4 severe tropical cyclone (Australian scale)
- Category 3 tropical cyclone (SSHWS)
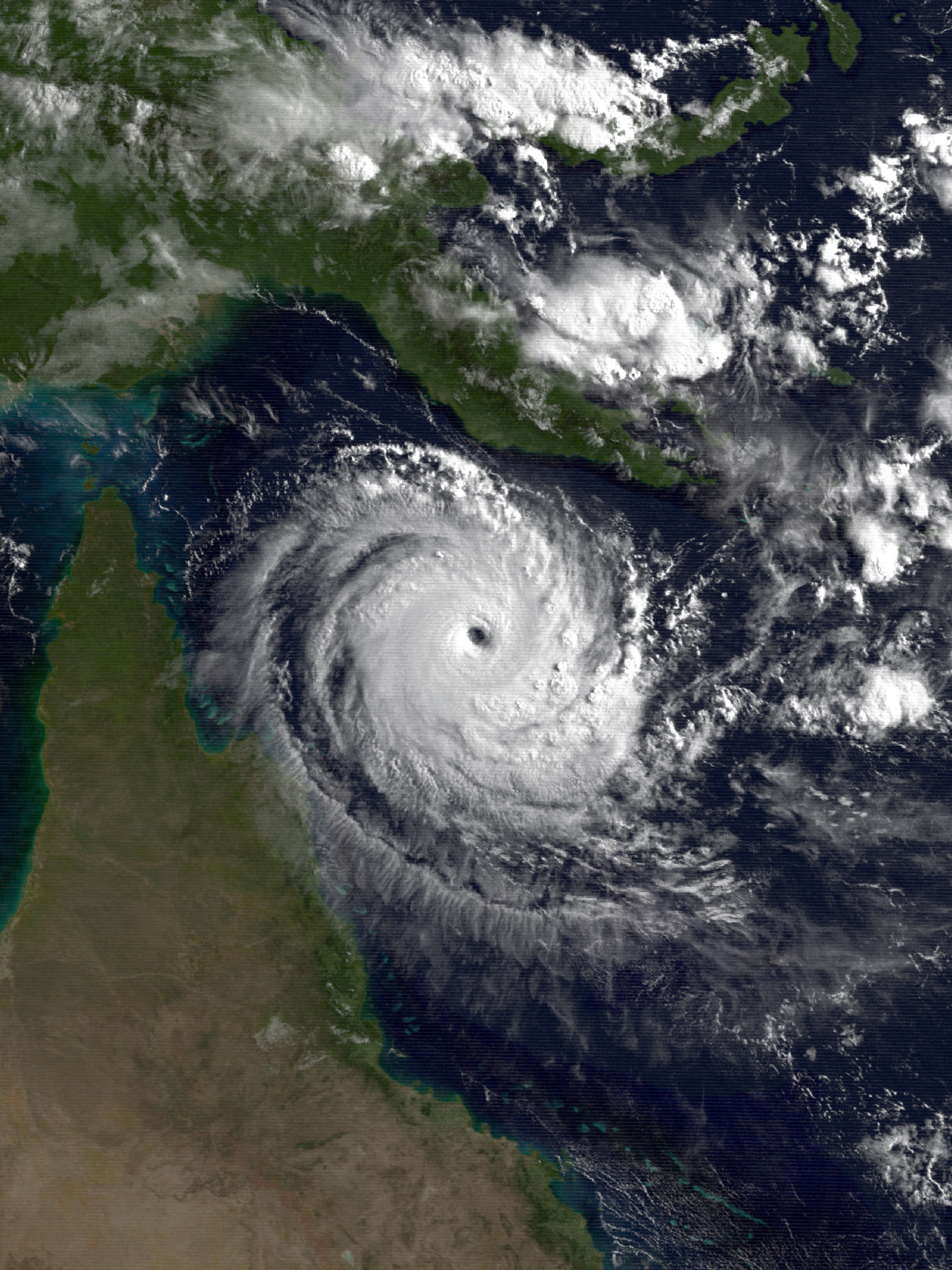
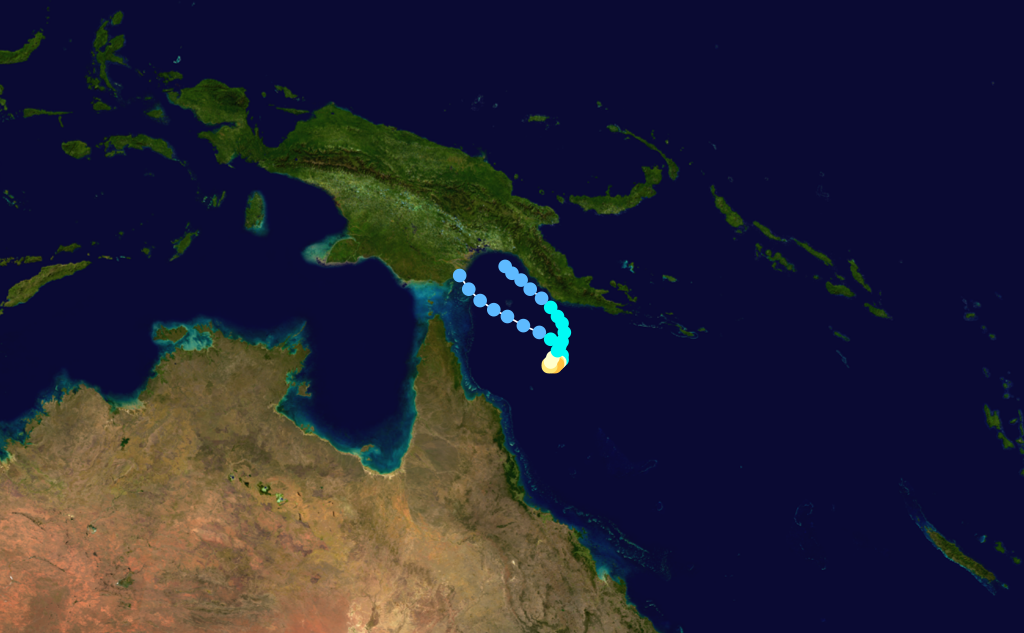
- Duration: 16 April – 23 April
- Peak intensity: 185 km/h (115 mph) (10-min); 945 hPa (mbar)

During the evening of 16 April, a tropical low formed near Papua New Guinea in the Gulf of Papua. The low started intensifying rapidly, becoming a category 1 tropical cyclone early on 17 April, being named Agnes. Agnes then moved around erratically over the next few days, eventually reaching peak intensity as a Category 4 severe tropical cyclone, with wind gusts of 165 km/h and a central pressure of 945 hPa. Agnes proceeded to weaken, becoming a tropical low on the 22 April before dissipating late that day.

== Storm names ==
=== TCWC Perth ===
- Annette
- Bobby
- Chloe

=== TCWC Brisbane ===
- Violet
- Warren
- Agnes

All the names used this season were retired by the Bureau of Meteorology. The replacement names were Adeline, Bertie and Clare for the Perth names and Verity, Wallace and Ann for the Brisbane names. Adeline, Bertie and Clare were used during 2005-06 while Wallace and Ann were used later in 2019 after a new naming list was formed. Verity was initially left off the combined list used from 2008, but was returned after the retirement of Veronica in 2019.

== Season effects ==
Name	Dates	Peak intensity			Areas affected	Damages (AU$)	Damages (US$)	Deaths
Name	Dates	Category	Wind speed (km/h (mph))	Pressure (hPa)	Areas affected	Damages (AU$)	Damages (US$)	Deaths
Annette	12 – 20 December	Category 4 severe tropical cyclone	195 km/h (120 mph)	925 hPa (27.31 inHg)	Western Australia	Minor	Minor	None
Heida	3 – 4 February	Tropical Low	55 km/h (35 mph)	995 hPa (29.38 inHg)	None	None	None	None
Bobby	19 – 27 February	Category 4 severe tropical cyclone	195 km/h (120 mph)	925 hPa (27.31 inHg)	Northern Territory, Western Australia	$11,000,000	$8,500,000	8
Violet	2 – 8 March	Category 3 severe tropical cyclone	150 km/h (90 mph)	960 hPa (28.34 inHg)	Queensland	None	None	None
Warren	4 – 7 March	Category 3 severe tropical cyclone	140 km/h (85 mph)	960 hPa (28.34 inHg)	Queensland, Northern Territory	None	None	None
Chloe	3 – 9 April	Category 5 severe tropical cyclone	205 km/h (125 mph)	920 hPa (27.17 inHg)	Northern Territory, Western Australia	None	None	None
20P	1 – 6 April	Tropical Depression	45 km/h (30 mph)	1004 hPa (29.64 inHg)	None	None	None	None
Agnes	16 – 23 April	Category 4 severe tropical cyclone	165 km/h (100 mph)	945 hPa (27.90 inHg)	Papua New Guinea	None	None	None
Season aggregates
8 systems	12 December – 23 April		205 km/h (125 mph)	920 hPa (27.17 inHg)		$8.5 million	8	

== See also ==
- List of Southern Hemisphere tropical cyclone seasons
- Atlantic hurricane seasons: 1994, 1995
- Pacific hurricane seasons: 1994, 1995
- Pacific typhoon seasons: 1994, 1995
- North Indian Ocean cyclone seasons: 1994, 1995
