= A Fada Oriana =

1958 book by Sophia de Mello Breyner Andresen

A Fada Oriana (OCLC 4063855), Portuguese for The Fairy Oriana, is one of the most emblematic children's book of Portuguese literature, written in 1958 by Sophia de Mello Breyner Andresen.

The main character is a fairy who was given the responsibility of ensuring the well-being of a forest and its inhabitants, the animals and plants. After a while, Oriana befriends a nefarious fish, and while contemplating her image reflected in the river, Oriana is mesmerized by the fish. Deceived by the words of this fish, Oriana ends up neglecting and abandoning the forest, with serious consequences for its denizens. Deprived of her powers as punishment for this failure, Oriana begins a journey of self-consciousness to repair the evils caused by her omission.

The book is a subject on Portuguese Language teaching curricula. It has been adapted to children's theatre several times, and has inspired derived works of illustration and animation.
