= 1994–95 South-West Indian Ocean cyclone season =

Cyclone season in the Southwest Indian Ocean

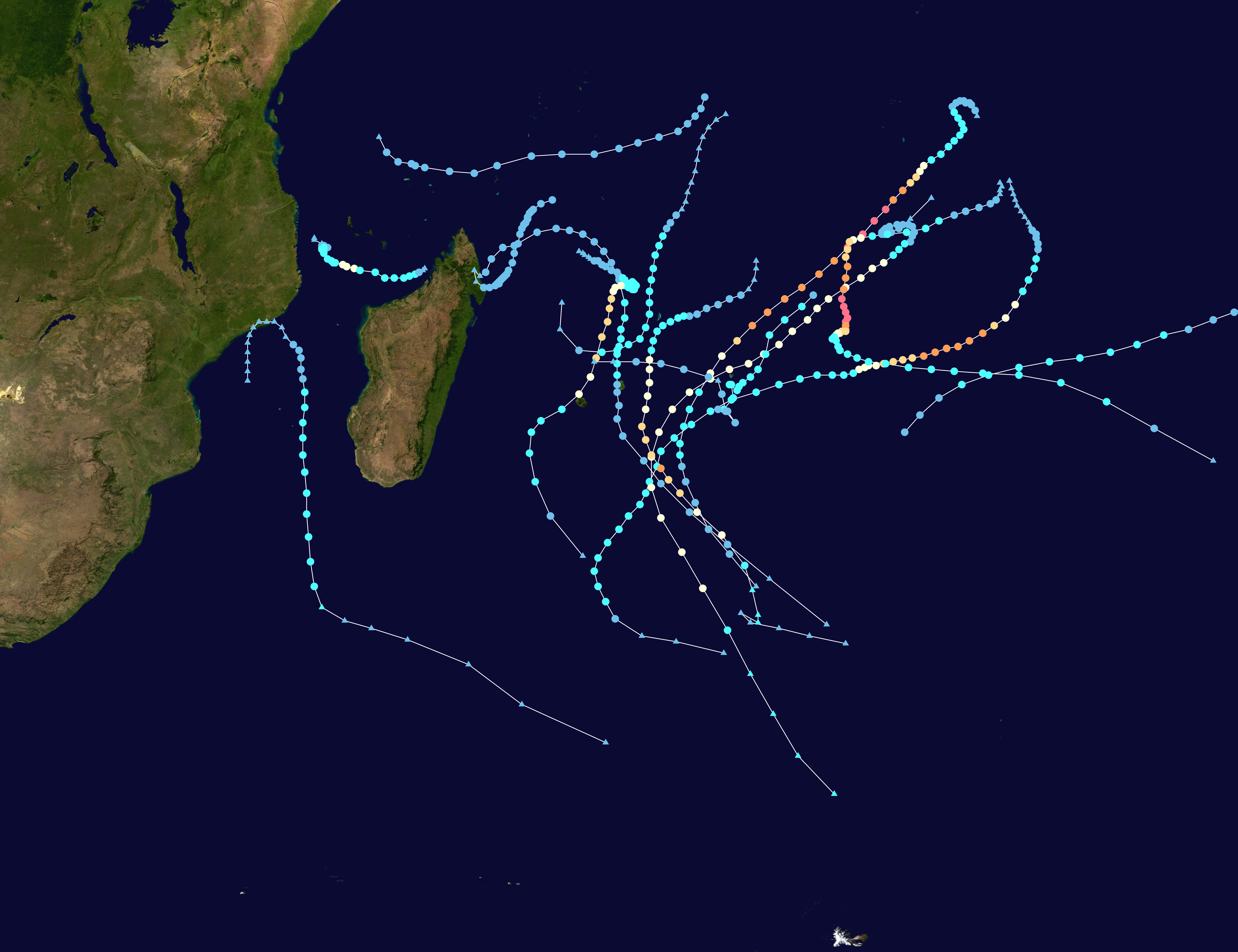
- Season summary map

Seasonal boundaries
- First system formed: October 2, 1994
- Last system dissipated: April 11, 1995

Strongest storm
- Name: Marlene
  - Maximum winds: 185 km/h (115 mph) (10-minute sustained)
  - Lowest pressure: 920 hPa (mbar)

Seasonal statistics
- Total disturbances: 20
- Total depressions: 13
- Total storms: 11
- Tropical cyclones: 5
- Intense tropical cyclones: 3
- Total fatalities: None reported
- Total damage: Unknown

Related articles
- 1994–95 Australian region cyclone season; 1994–95 South Pacific cyclone season

The 1994–95 South-West Indian Ocean cyclone season was fairly active, with storms forming regularly from October through April. It was much less damaging than its predecessor, and most of the storms in the season remained over water or only brushed land. The first system was Tropical Depression A1, which formed in October and passed north of Madagascar. The first named storm was Albertine, which formed on November 23 in the northeastern portion of the basin and became one of three intense tropical cyclones. The last storm was Marlene, which was also an intense tropical cyclone and dissipated on April 11.

Most of the storms originated from the Intertropical Convergence Zone. In late December into early January, tropical storms Bentha and Christelle persisted to the east of Madagascar, undergoing the Fujiwhara effect with each other. Later in January, Dorina became the second of three intense tropical cyclones, but weakened before passing near Rodrigues. Tropical Depression Eliceca and Tropical Storm Fodah both formed in the Mozambique Channel toward the end of January, bringing gusty winds and rainfall to the region. In February, Gail produced gusty winds on Rodrigues, and Tropical Storm Heida entered the basin from Australian region. Later in the month, Ingrid brought strong winds to Mauritius. Tropical storms Josta and Kylie developed toward the beginning of March from the same overall system, affecting Madagascar and Réunion, respectively. After they dissipated, Tropical Depression Lidy caused flooding and damage on Rodrigues due to heavy rainfall.

== Seasonal summary ==
During the year, the Météo-France office on Réunion (MFR) issued warnings for tropical systems in the region as the Regional Specialised Meteorological Centre. In the year, MFR tracked tropical cyclones south of the equator from the coast of Africa to 90° E. The Joint Typhoon Warning Center (JTWC) also issued warnings in an unofficial capacity.

Several of the storms in the season affected the island of Rodrigues, an outer island of Mauritius; however, only one – Tropical Depression Lidy – caused damage after dropping heavy rainfall. The season as a whole was much less damaging than the preceding season. There were 58 days in which a storm or cyclone was active, 17 above normal. There were 11 systems that became moderate tropical storms, two above the normal of 9. The six tropical cyclones – a storm with winds of 120 km/h (75 mph) – was also above the average of five.

== Systems ==
=== Intense Tropical Cyclone Albertine ===
- Intense tropical cyclone (MFR)
- Category 4 tropical cyclone (SSHWS)
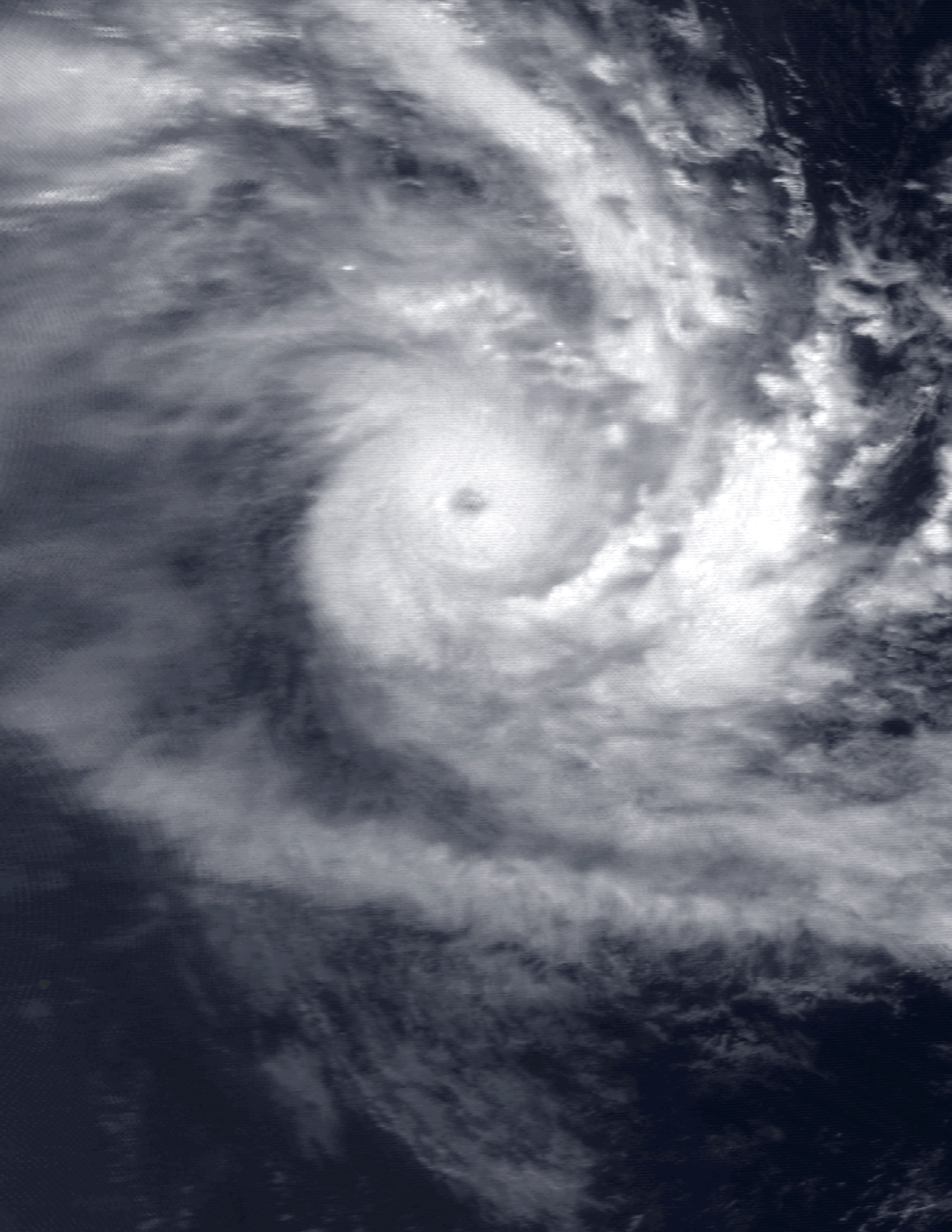
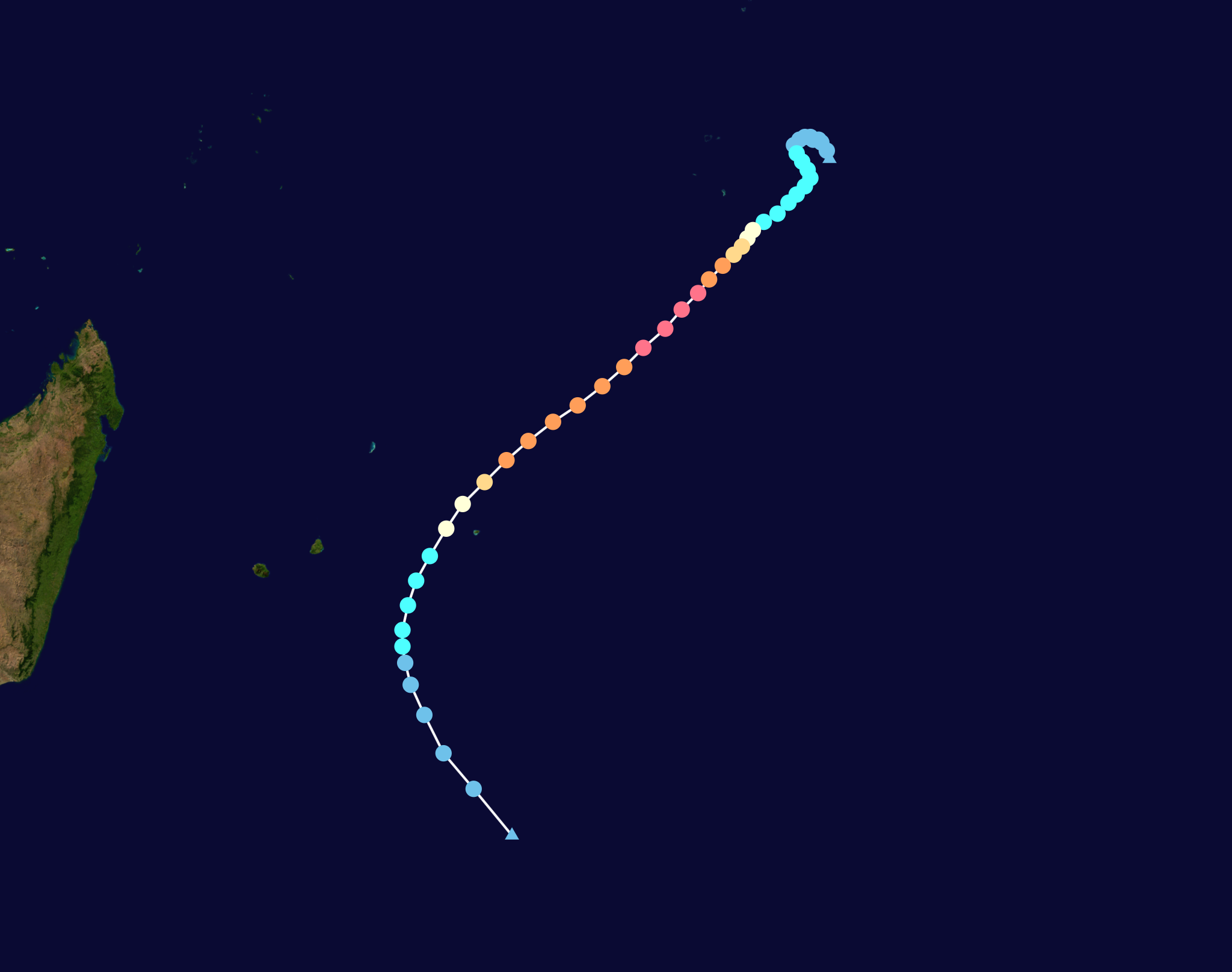
- Duration: November 23 – December 3
- Peak intensity: 175 km/h (110 mph) (10-min); 925 hPa (mbar)

The Intertropical Convergence Zone (ITCZ) became active toward the end of November, spawning a low-pressure area on November 23 about 400 km (250 mi) east of Diego Garcia. This system quickly organized into a tropical disturbance, aided by favorable conditions. On November 24, the JTWC began classifying it as Tropical Cyclone 02S. The next day, the system intensified into Tropical Storm Albertine while moving southwestward, steered by a ridge to the southeast. Late on November 25, an eye developed in the center of the convection, and Albertine intensified to tropical cyclone status the next day. The eye gradually became better organized, attaining a diameter of 90 km (55 mi) on November 28 as Albertine became an intense tropical cyclone. At that time, the MFR estimated peak 10–minute winds of 175 km/h (110 mph), with gusts to 250 km/h (160 mph). In contrast, the JTWC estimated 1–minute winds of 215 km/h (135 mph). After moving over an area of cool water temperatures, Albertine quickly weakened and lost its well-defined eye. On November 30, the center passed about 110 km (68 mi) northwest of Rodrigues after weakening to severe tropical storm status. After weakening gradually, the storm began deteriorating faster due to increasing wind shear. A polar low steered Albertine southeastward until absorbing the system on December 3.

In its formative stages, Albertine brushed Diego Garcia with gusts of 63 km/h (39 mph). On Rodridgues, Albertine produced peak gusts of 170 km/h (110 mph), along with heavy rainfall, causing some damage. The island was under a cyclone watch for 39 hours, the first of the warning system set up by MFR during the season.

=== Moderate Tropical Storm Christelle ===
- Moderate tropical storm (MFR)
- Tropical storm (SSHWS)
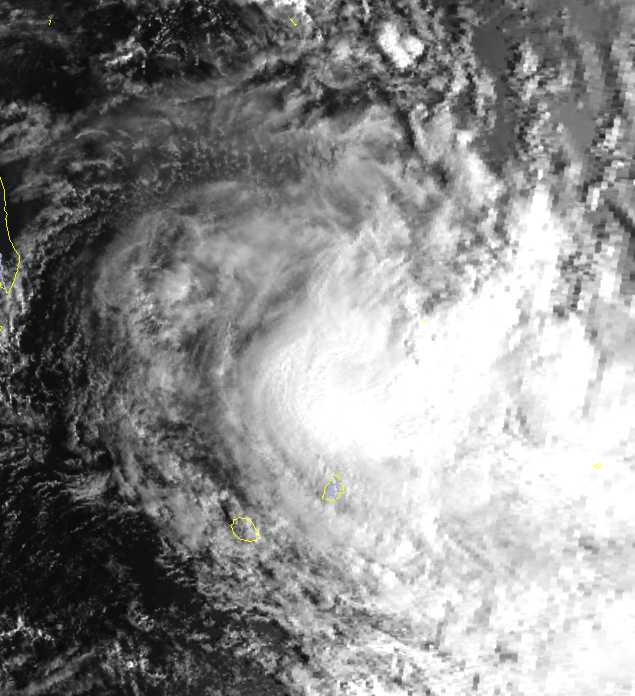
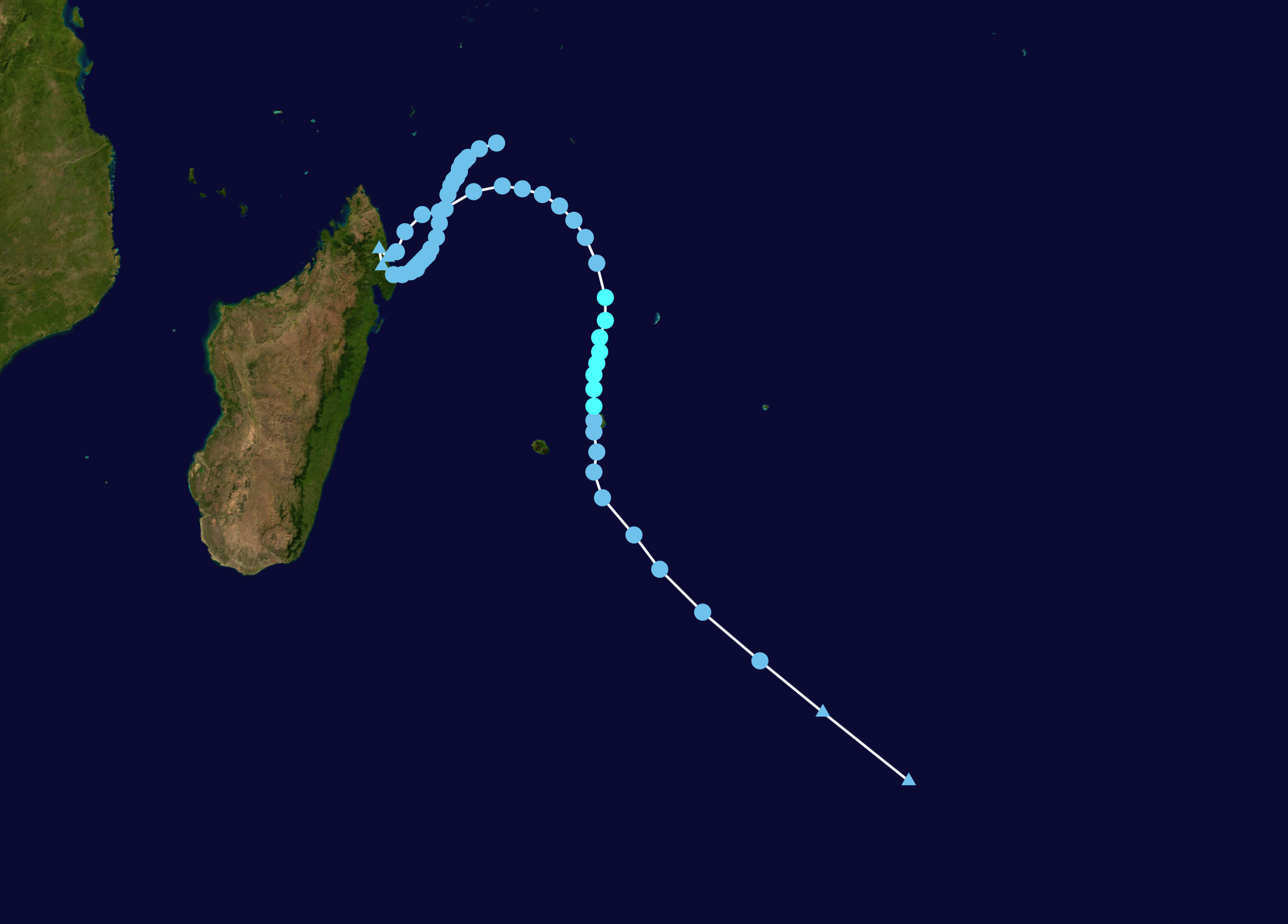
- Duration: December 27 – January 11
- Peak intensity: 85 km/h (50 mph) (10-min); 980 hPa (mbar)

Toward the end of December, the equatorial trough spawned two areas of convection – one persisted southwest of Diego Garcia, which would become Tropical Storm Bentha, and the other persisted between Agaléga and the Farquhar Group in the Seychelles. The latter system organized into Tropical Disturbance B1 on December 27, but wind shear in the region prevented significant development and dislocated the center from the thunderstorms. A ridge to the southeast steered the disturbance slowly southwestward toward Madagascar. As it neared the country, the system turned westward and intensified into a tropical depression after developing a spiral band of convection. On January 2, the depression made landfall near Antalaha in northeastern Madagascar, and quickly weakened over land.

The system moved to the northeast and looped back to the east, influenced by developing Tropical Storm Bentha. On January 4, after Bentha was named, the system was renamed Tropical Disturbance C1. Convection gradually reorganized over the center as the two storms interacted and moved cyclonically around each other. The disturbance intensified after Bentha began weakening, becoming Tropical Storm Christelle on January 5. On the next day, the JTWC began issuing advisories on Tropical Cyclone 07S. Christelle slowly intensified as it turned more to the south, becoming the dominant system after absorbing Bentha. A warm spot formed in the center of the convection, and the MFR estimated peak winds of 85 km/h (55 mph) on January 6. The same wind shear that weakened Bentha caused Christelle to deteriorate on January 7. The center passed near Mauritius on January 8 as a tropical depression. Two days later, a cold front steered the system to the southeast, absorbing it after Christelle became extratropical on January 11.

Both Bentha and Christelle brought gusty winds and rainfall to Mauritius, and caused Réunion to be under a cyclone watch for five days. The system also produced rainfall and landslides in Madagascar.

=== Moderate Tropical Storm Bentha ===
- Moderate tropical storm (MFR)
- Tropical storm (SSHWS)
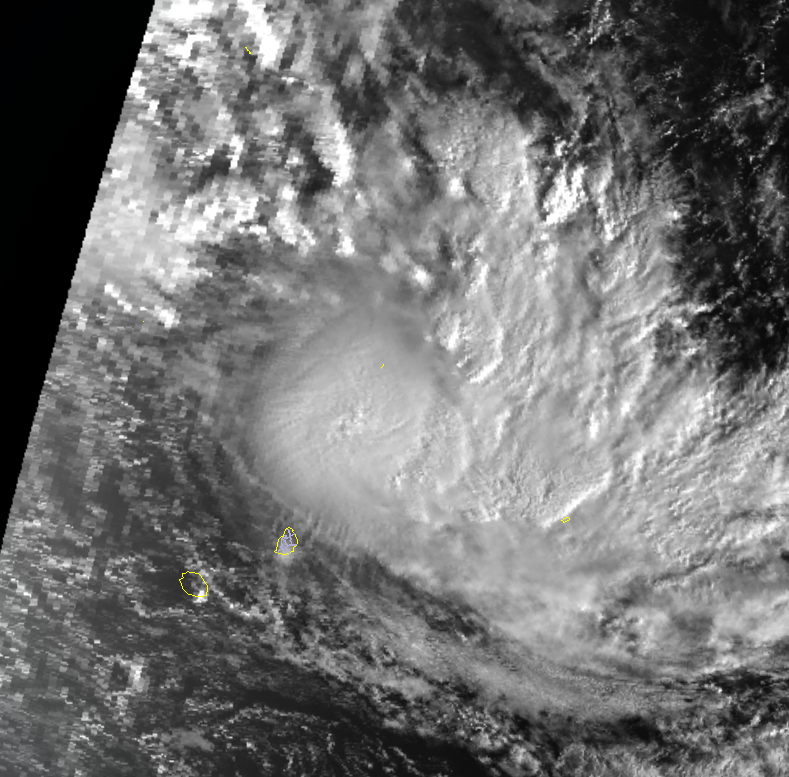
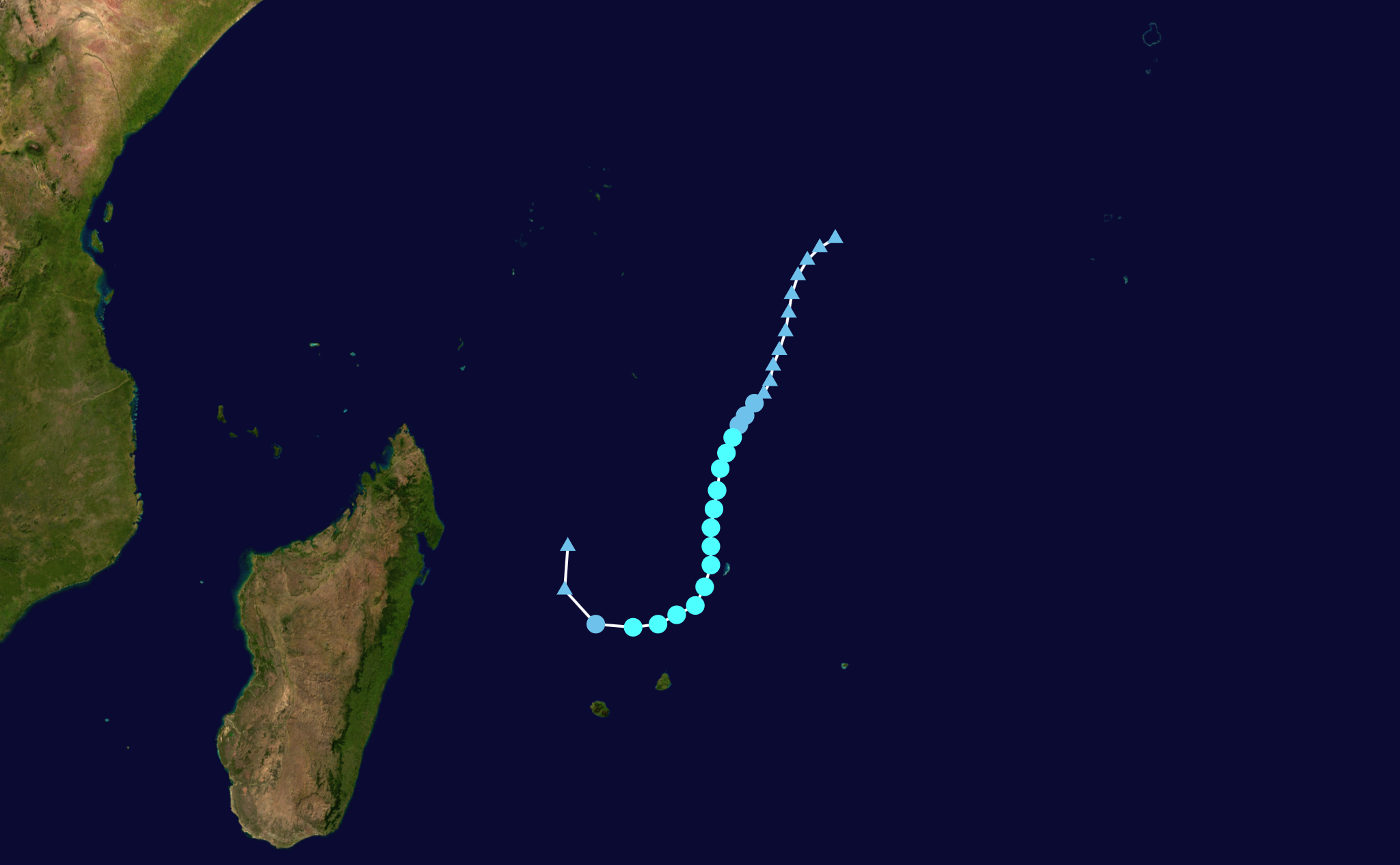
- Duration: January 2 – January 6
- Peak intensity: 85 km/h (50 mph) (10-min); 984 hPa (mbar)

The same broad system that spawned Christelle also produced an area of convection southwest of Diego Garcia toward the end of December. On January 1, the convection began organizing, aided by an anticyclone aloft, and it became a tropical depression on the next day. The system quickly intensified into Tropical Storm Bentha on January 3 while moving generally southwestward. Also on that day, the JTWC classified it as Tropical Cyclone 06S. On January 4, Bentha attained peak winds of 85 km/h (55 mph), and on the same day the storm began interacting with developing Tropical Storm Christelle to the west. On January 5, increased shear weakened Bentha, and by the following day the storm deteriorated into a tropical depression. The system passed about 250 km (155 mi) north of Réunion on January 6, dissipating shortly thereafter near Tromelin Island while being absorbed into Christelle.

Both Bentha and Christelle brought gusty winds and rainfall to Mauritius, and caused Réunion to be under a cyclone watch for five days.

=== Intense Tropical Cyclone Dorina ===
- Intense tropical cyclone (MFR)
- Category 3 tropical cyclone (SSHWS)
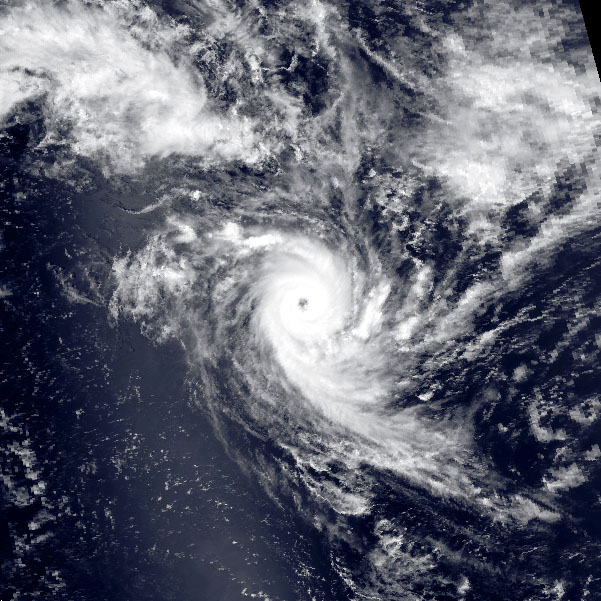
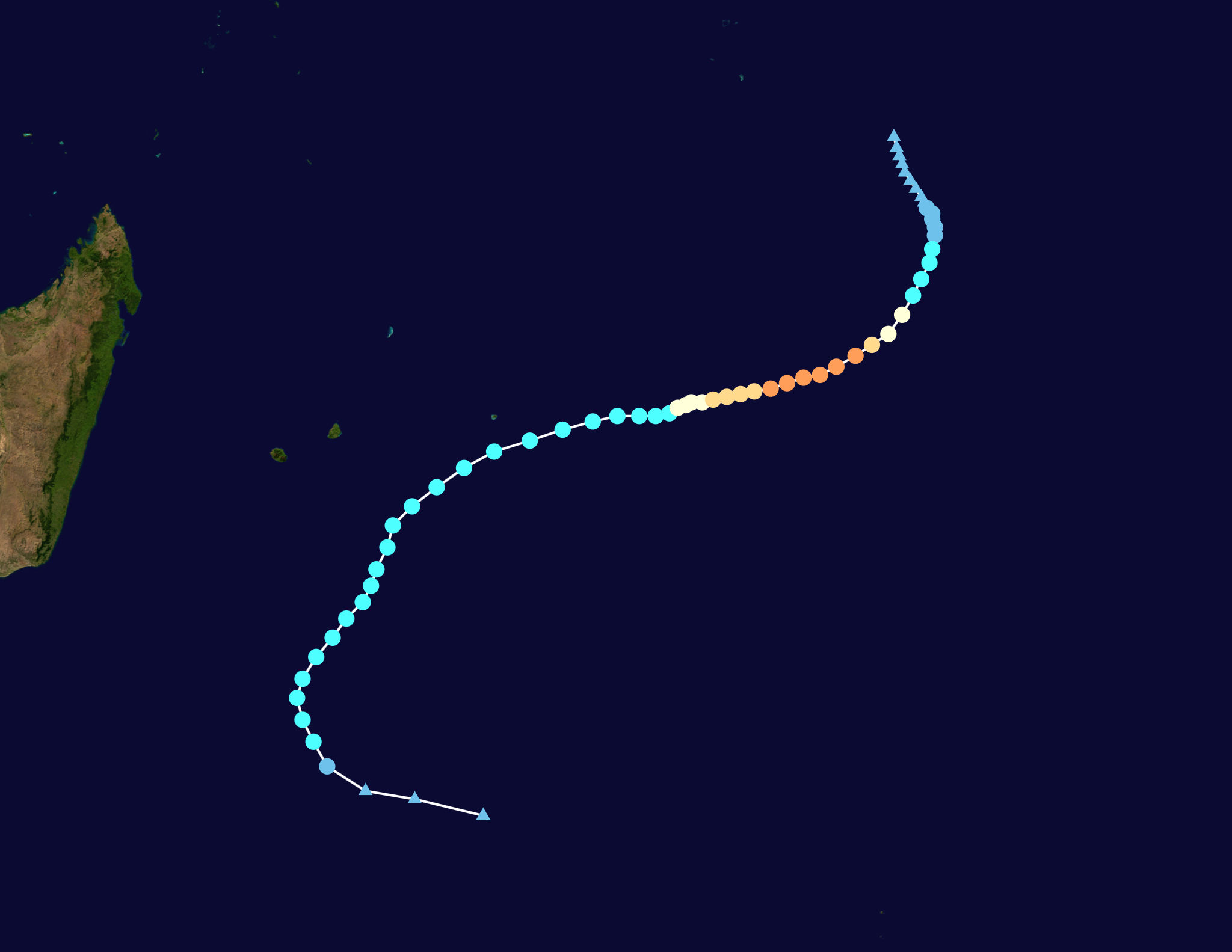
- Duration: January 18 – February 1
- Peak intensity: 175 km/h (110 mph) (10-min); 925 hPa (mbar)

The ITCZ spawned an area of convection and a vortex in the northeastern portion of the basin on January 18, which organized into a tropical disturbance that day. It initially moved southeastward under the influence of the monsoon, although it gradually recurved back to the southwest. On January 19, the system intensified into Tropical Storm Dorina, and on the next day the JTWC initiated advisories on it as Tropical Cyclone 08S. Dorina quickly intensified into a tropical cyclone by January 21, developing a 40 km (25 mi) eye in the center of the convection. Later that day, the storm became an intense tropical cyclone, less than three days after its development; such a quick time to attain that intensity is unusual for the basin. At 18:00 UTC on January 21, Dorina attained peak winds of 175 km/h (110 mph), according to the MFR, and 185 km/h (115 mph) according to the JTWC.

After moving over an area of cooler waters, Dorina began weakening, indicated by the previously well-defined eye becoming ragged. On January 24, the cyclone weakened into a severe tropical storm. The motion became more west-southwesterly after the ridge weakened. A passing trough increased shear over Dorina, which caused further weakening and for the convection to deteriorate. However, conditions became more favorable on January 27, allowing Dorina to re-intensify slightly as it redeveloped an eye feature. On that day, the storm passed about 250 km (155 mi) south of Rodrigues, producing gusts of 115 km/h (70 mph). Subsequently, Dorina turned back to the southwest and later to the south, influenced by another passing trough that had absorbed Tropical Storm Fodah. Strong wind shear caused the storm to weaken again. On January 31, Dorina became extratropical while turning to the southeast and was later absorbed into the trough.

=== Severe Tropical Storm Fodah ===
- Severe tropical storm (MFR)
- Tropical storm (SSHWS)
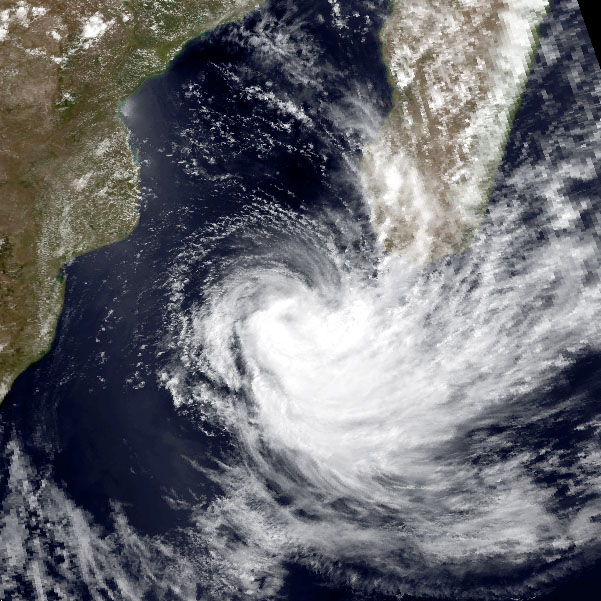
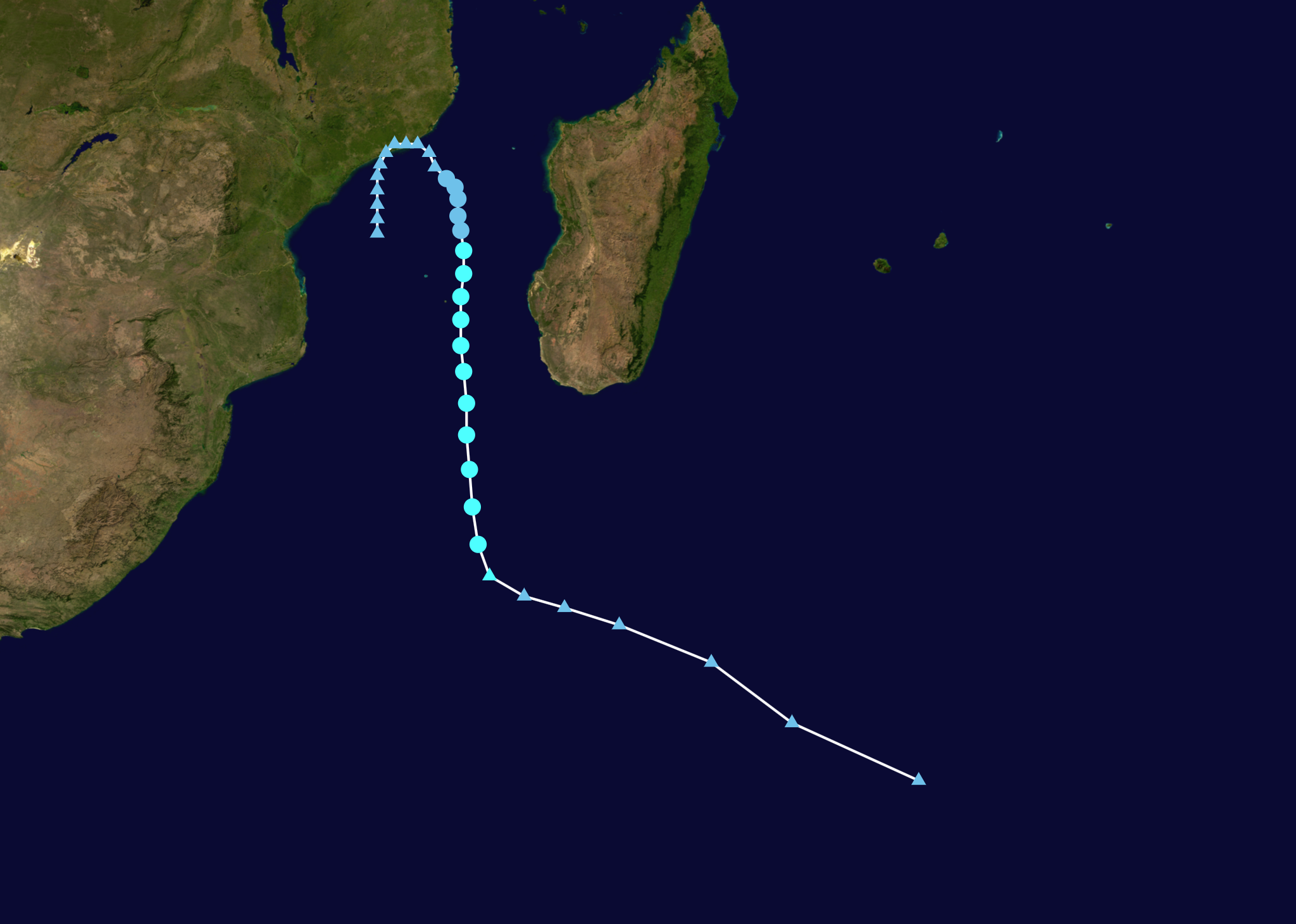
- Duration: January 22 – January 28
- Peak intensity: 100 km/h (65 mph) (10-min); 970 hPa (mbar)

After the remnants of Tropical Depression Eliceca dissipated over Madagascar, an area of disturbed weather persisted over the Mozambique Channel, spawning a low-pressure area near Juan de Nova Island on January 21. Convection greatly increased on the next day, indicating the system became a tropical disturbance. Moving southward, the system became a tropical depression on January 23 as the system organized further, aided by an anticyclone aloft. On January 24, the depression intensified into Tropical Storm Fodah while near Europa Island, and soon after became a severe tropical storm. The MFR estimated peak winds of 100 km/h (60 mph), while the JTWC, which initiated advisories that day as Tropical Cyclone 09S, estimated winds of 85 km/h (55 mph). Gusts on Europa Island were less than 110 km/h (70 mph), despite the storm being nearby. A strong band of convection spread along the Madagascar coastline, producing gusts of 180 km/h (110 mph) at Morombe. Fodah also produced 250 mm (9.8 in) of rainfall, as well as high seas. Moving around the ridge, Fodah continued southward, encountering stronger wind shear on January 25. Steady weakening commenced as the convection deteriorated, and Fodah became extratropical on January 26. A trough turned the remnants to the southeast, absorbing it on January 29.

=== Tropical Cyclone Gail ===
- Tropical cyclone (MFR)
- Category 1 tropical cyclone (SSHWS)
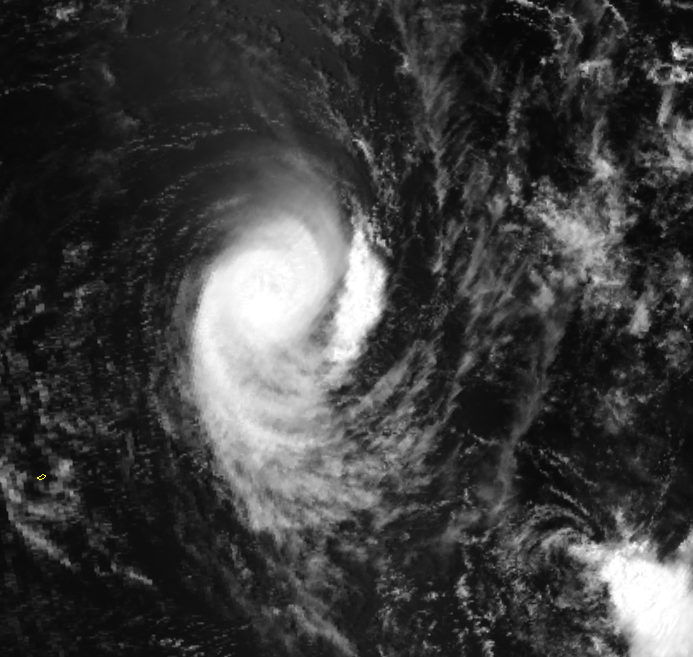
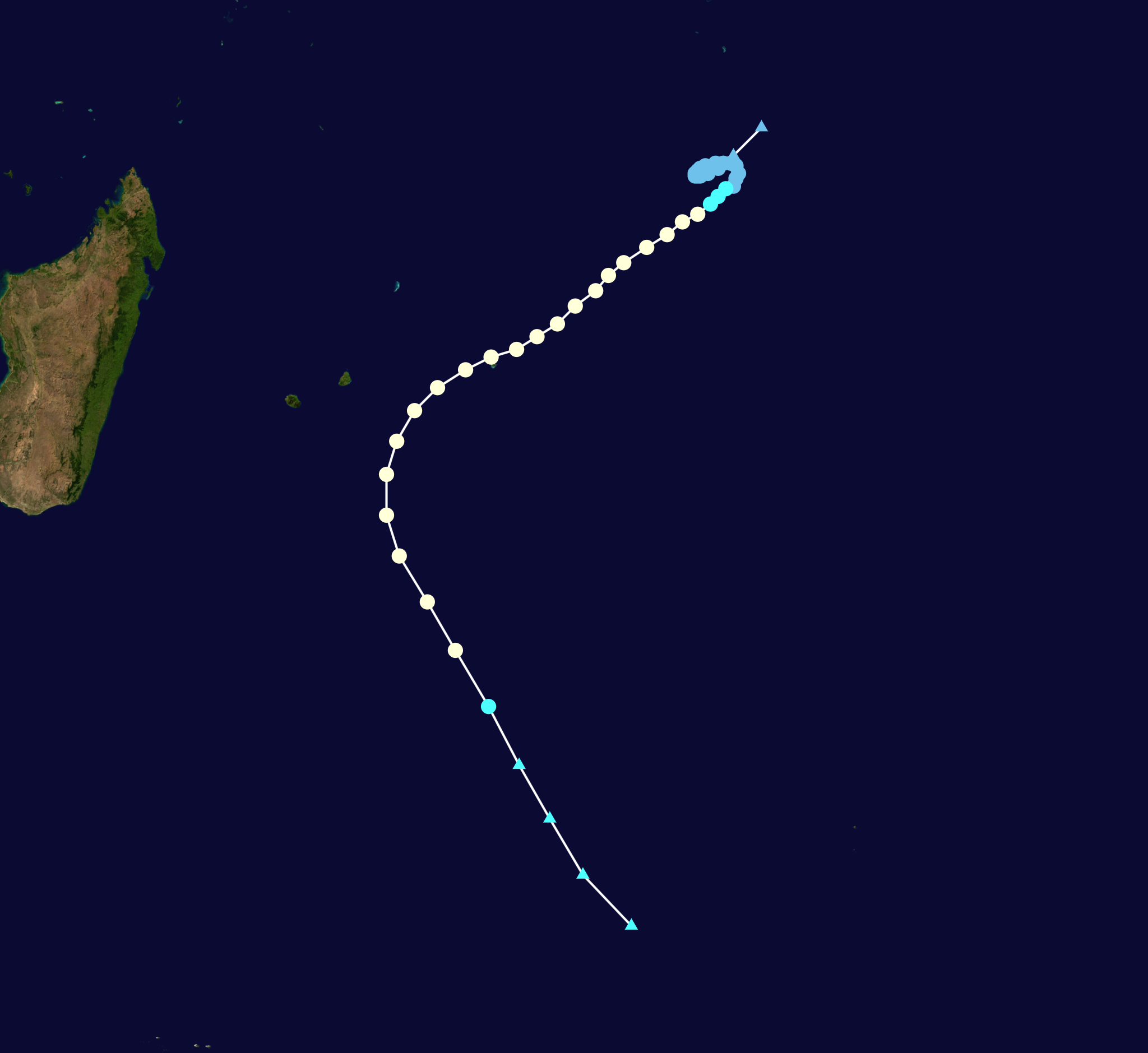
- Duration: January 31 – February 11
- Peak intensity: 120 km/h (75 mph) (10-min); 970 hPa (mbar)

The ITCZ spawned an area of convection near Diego Garcia that became a tropical disturbance on January 31. The system slowly organized due to wind shear in the region, and it moved slowly for several days. On February 4, the disturbance became a tropical depression after the convection organized slightly. Intensification became more rapid on the next day after conditions became more favorable, allowing the depression to intensify into Tropical Storm Gail. Also on February 5, the JTWC began issuing warnings on the system as Tropical Cyclone 10S. Gail quickly strengthened while moving southwestward, developing a small, poorly defined eye in the center of the convection. On February 7, it attained tropical cyclone status, reaching peak winds of 120 km/h (75 mph). Increasing shear caused Gail to weaken, beginning on February 8. That night, the center passed less than 30 km (20 mi) north of Rodrigues. Gail maintained its intensity as a severe tropical storm after the shear decreased slightly. A trough turned the storm to the south on February 10 and caused weakening, resulting in Gail's dissipation on the next day.

While Gail approached the island of Rodrigues, the storm produced winds of 120 km/h (75 mph) and gusts to 193 km/h (120 mph) at Port Mathurin.

=== Moderate Tropical Storm Heida ===
- Moderate tropical storm (MFR)
- Tropical storm (SSHWS)
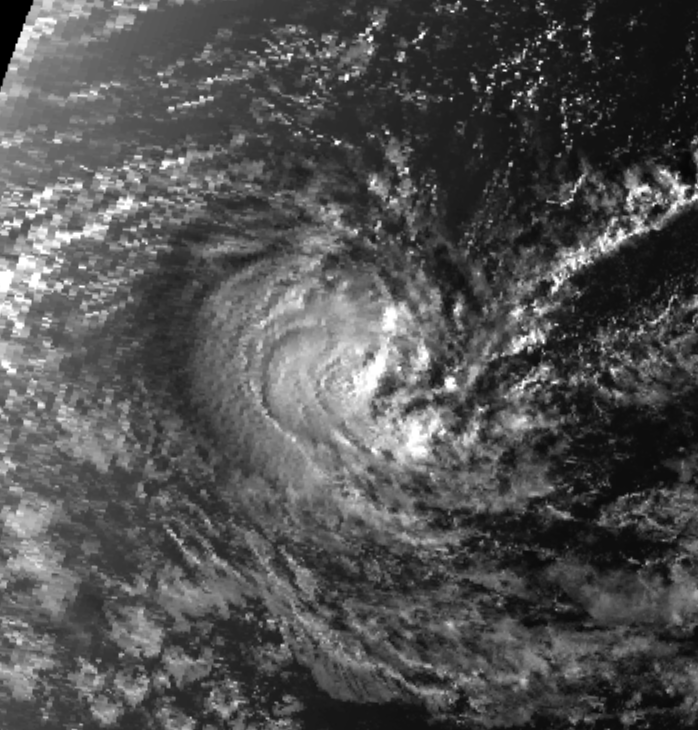
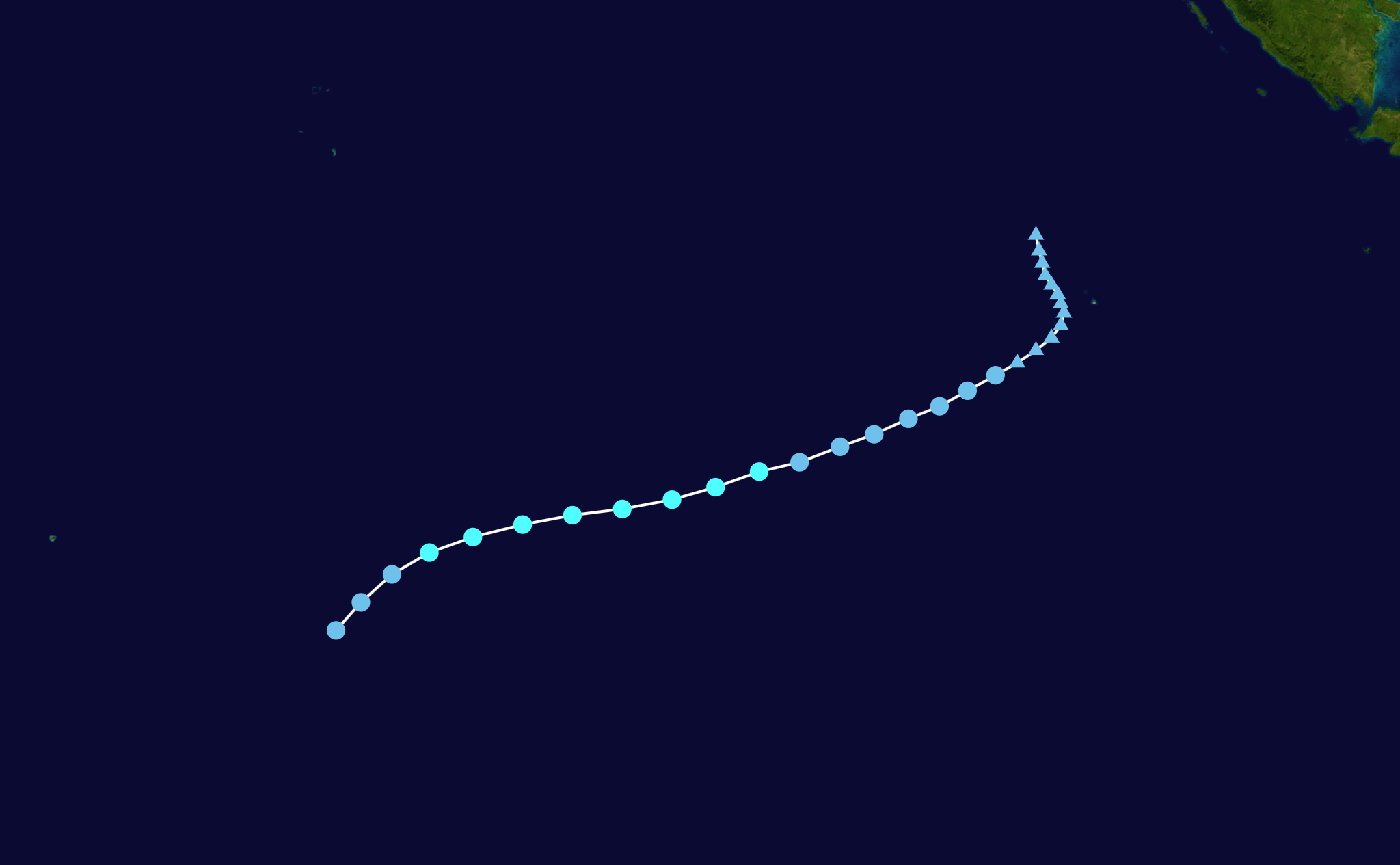
- Duration: February 4 (Entered basin) – February 8
- Peak intensity: 75 km/h (45 mph) (10-min); 990 hPa (mbar)

As Gail was developing, the ITCZ spawned another disturbance in the Australian region on February 3. On the next day, it crossed 90° E into the south-west Indian Ocean as a tropical depression. The system intensified into Tropical Storm Heida on February 5 while moving west-southwestward, although the convection never organized beyond a disorganized central dense overcast. The JTWC initiated advisories that day as Tropical Cyclone 11S, and Heida quickly attained peak winds of 75 km/h (45 mph). Wind shear in the region caused the storm to weaken into a tropical depression, although Heida briefly re-intensified into a tropical storm on February 6. A trough in the region steered the circulation to the south-southwest and increased wind shear, resulting in Heida's dissipation on February 8.

=== Tropical Cyclone Ingrid ===
- Tropical cyclone (MFR)
- Category 3 tropical cyclone (SSHWS)
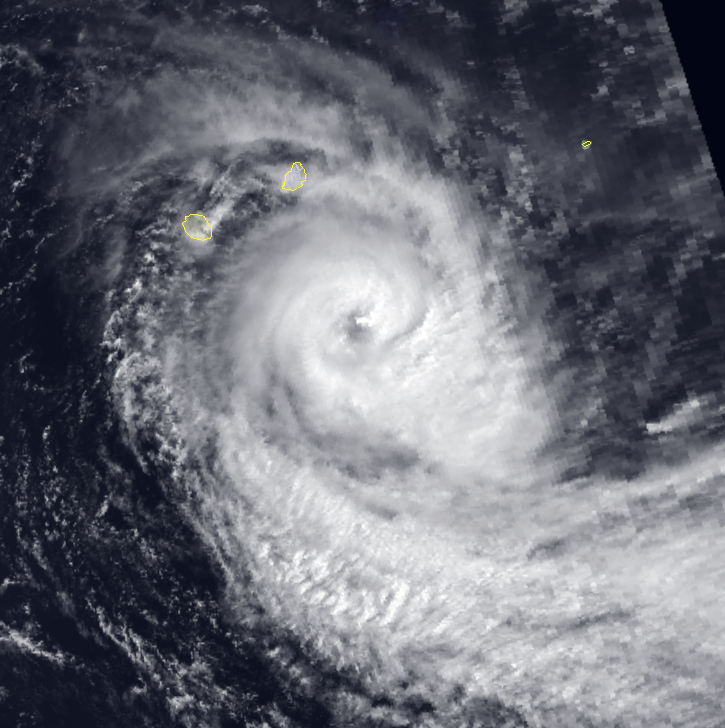
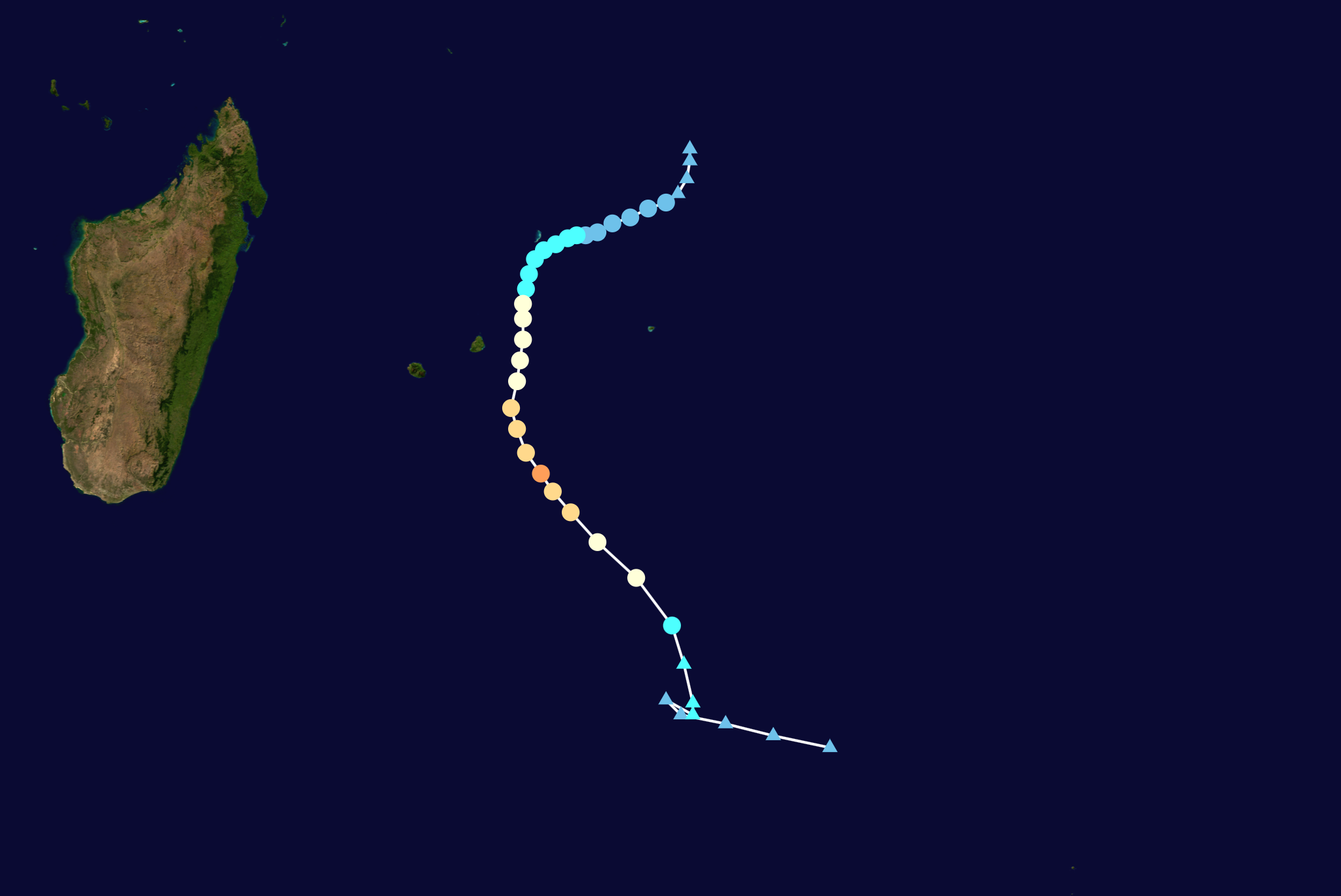
- Duration: February 22 – March 3
- Peak intensity: 150 km/h (90 mph) (10-min); 945 hPa (mbar)

On February 22, a tropical disturbance formed southwest of Diego Garcia. It moved westward, intensifying into Tropical Storm Ingrid on February 24. That day, the JTWC began issuing advisories on the storm as Tropical Cyclone 13S. Ingrid turned more to the southwest while passing just east of St. Brandon, where winds reached 56 km/h (35 mph). After continued intensification, the storm became a tropical cyclone on February 26 while passing between Mauritius and Rodrigues. On Mauritius, winds gusted to 91 km/h (56 mph) at Sir Seewoosagur Ramgoolam International Airport, and the storm produced high waves. On the next day, the MFR estimated peak winds of 150 km/h (95 mph), while the JTWC estimated winds of 185 km/h (115 mph). Ingrid turned to the southeast and weakened, becoming extratropical on March 1.

=== Severe Tropical Storm Josta ===
- Severe tropical storm (MFR)
- Category 1 tropical cyclone (SSHWS)
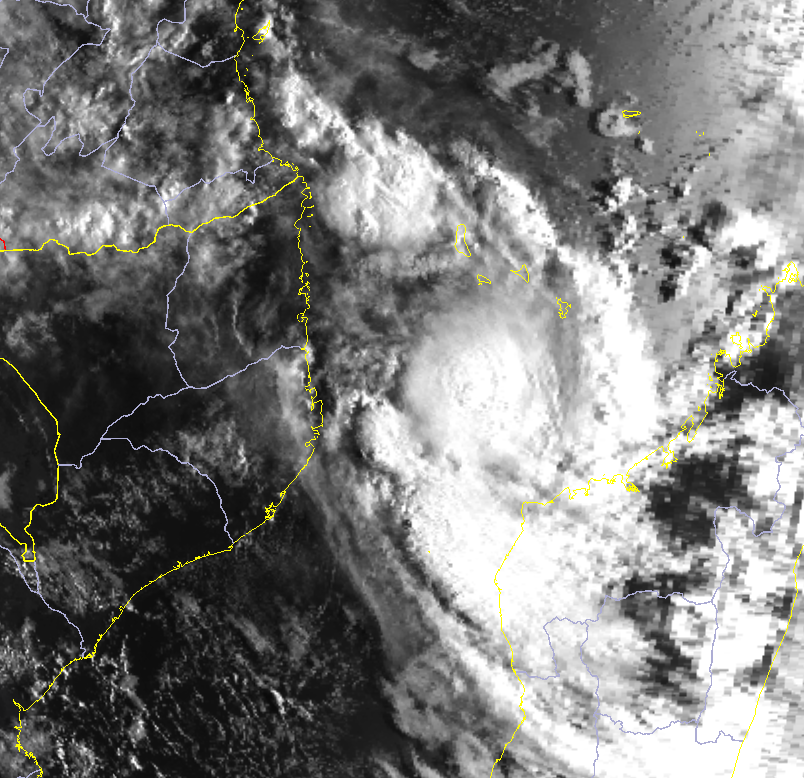
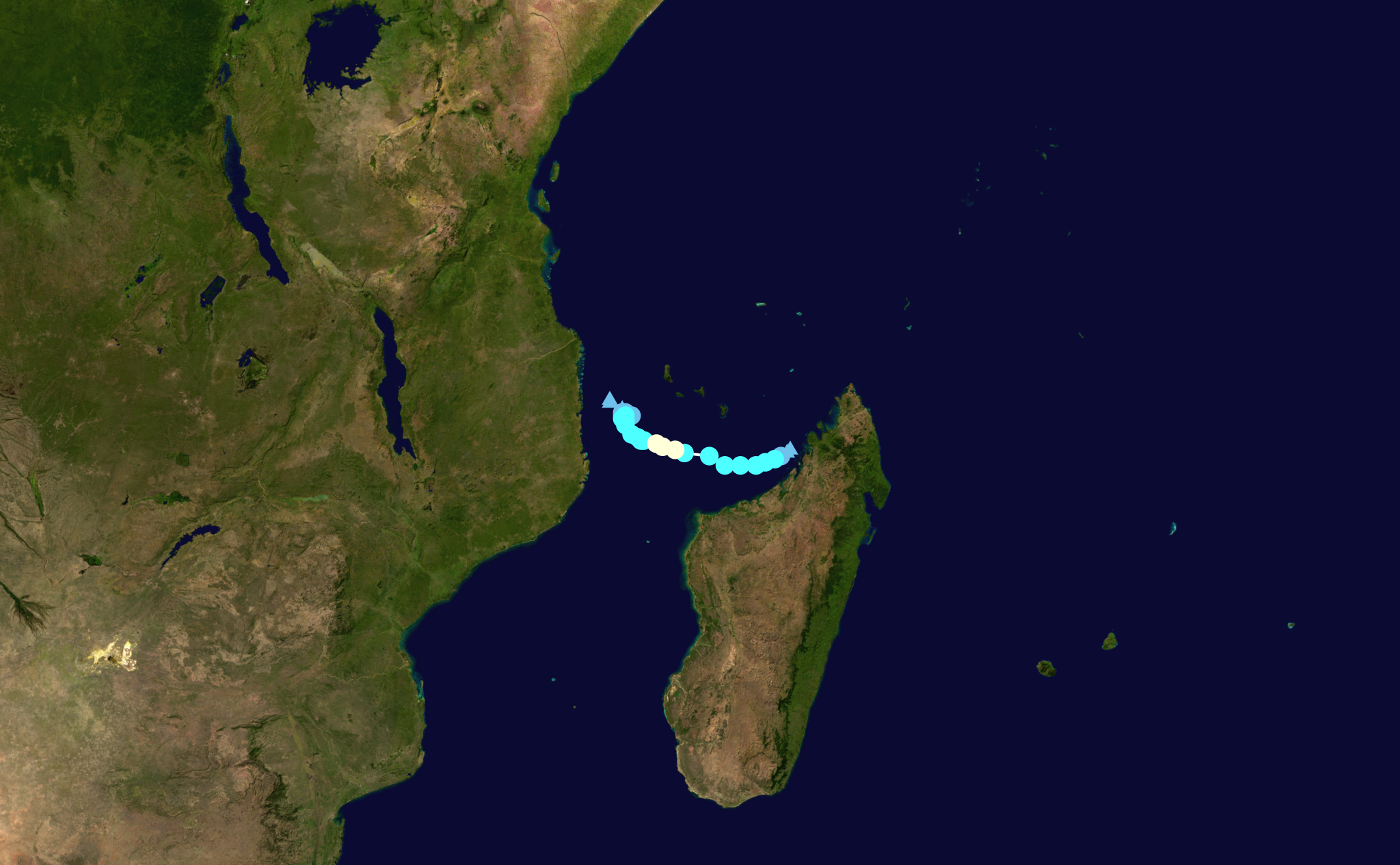
- Duration: March 5 – March 12
- Peak intensity: 105 km/h (65 mph) (10-min); 972 hPa (mbar)

An extended series of low-pressure areas spawned what would become Tropical Storm Josta on March 5 near the Comoros in the northern Mozambique Channel. It initially drifted westward while slowly organizing, becoming a tropical storm on March 7. On that day, the JTWC classified Josta as Tropical Cyclone 16S. On March 8, Josta approached the coast of Mozambique within 90 km (55 mi) of Pemba before turning abruptly to the east-southeast. The convection fluctuated in intensity, eventually becoming better organized on March 9. That day, an eye feature formed in the center of the convection, and the MFR estimated peak winds of 105 km/h (65 mph). By contrast, the JTWC upgraded Josta to the equivalent of a minimal hurricane with winds of 120 km/h (75 mph). The eye feature dissipated soon after due to increased shear, causing Josta to weaken. On March 10, the storm re-intensified slightly, aided by the monsoon, as it passed 160 km (100 mi) south of Mayotte. It again weakened soon thereafter, with the convection spreading ahead of the circulation over Madagascar. On March 12, the circulation dissipated off the northwest coast of Madagascar, partially due to the influence of the stronger Kylie to the southeast. Rains from the storm reached 270 mm (11 in) along the coast of Madagascar, despite the storm not making landfall.

=== Moderate Tropical Storm Kylie ===
- Moderate tropical storm (MFR)
- Category 2 tropical cyclone (SSHWS)
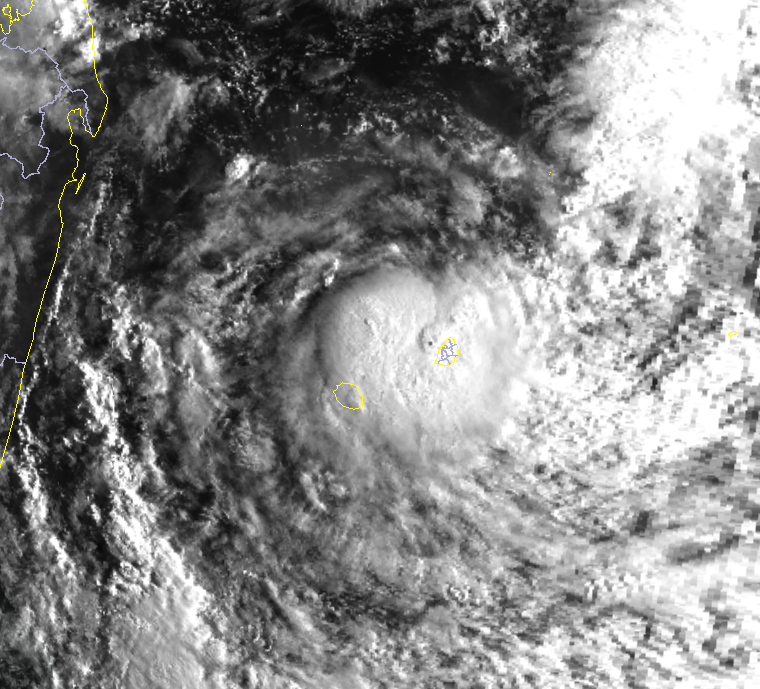
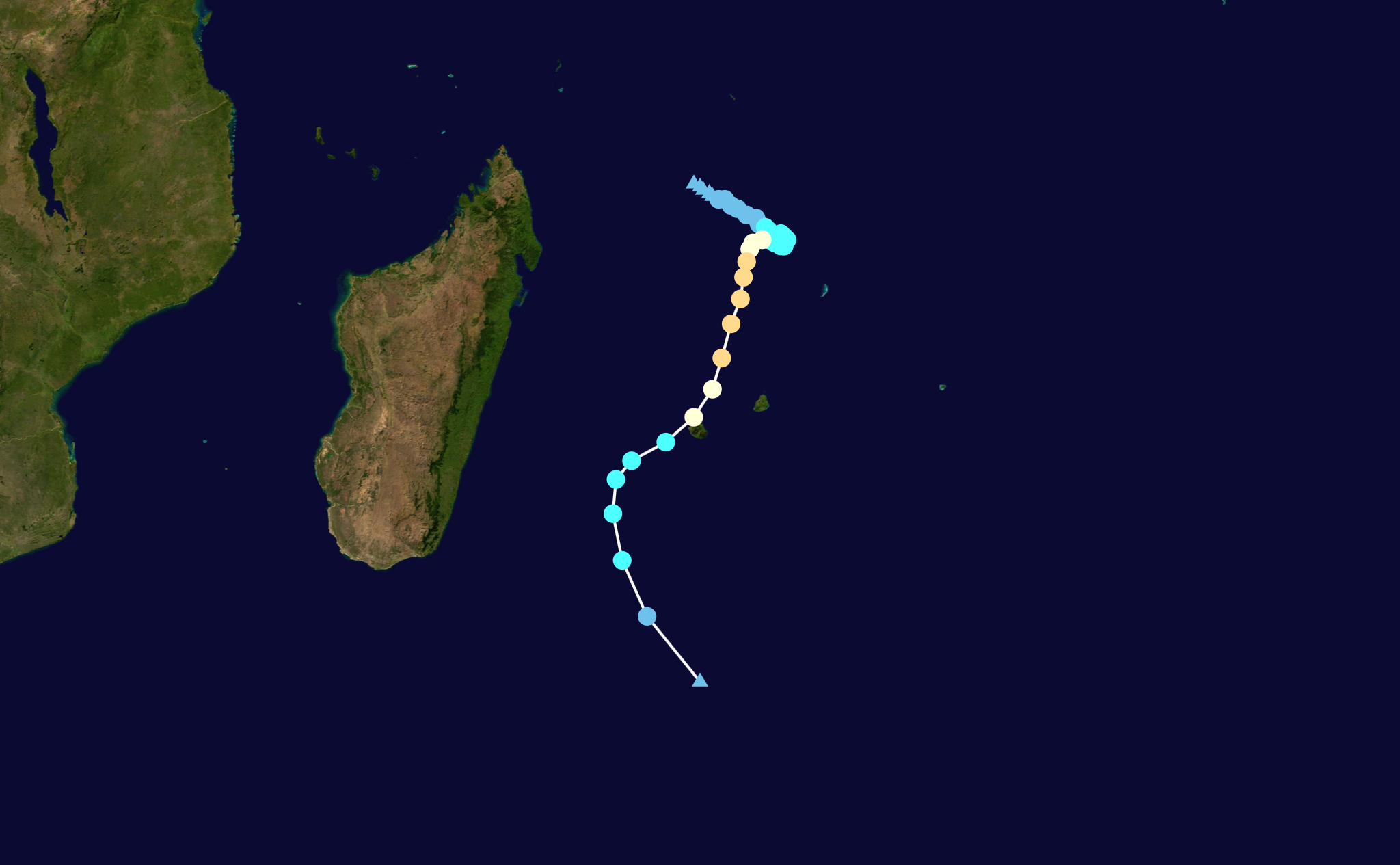
- Duration: March 6 – March 14
- Peak intensity: 85 km/h (50 mph) (10-min); 984 hPa (mbar)

The same overall system that spawned Josta also produced a disturbance on March 6 off the east coast of Madagascar. While drifting southeastward within a trough, the system slowly organized until becoming a tropical storm on March 7, the same day that the JTWC classified it as Tropical Cyclone 17S. On the next day, the system was named Kylie as it meandered to the north of Mauritius without further strengthening. The convection organized on March 10 into a central dense overcast, and the next day attained peak winds of 85 km/h (55 mph), according to the MFR. By contrast, the JTWC assessed Kylie as becoming much stronger, reaching winds of 160 km/h (100 mph). Subsequently, a trough turned the storm to the southwest, bringing it over the island of Réunion on March 13. Increased wind shear deteriorated the convection as the storm turned to the southeast on March 14. The next day, Kylie was absorbed by the trough.

On Réunion, Kylie produced rainfall along with gusts of over 100 km/h (65 km/h), along with high waves. The storm prompted classes to be canceled, as well as for the airport to be closed, causing flights to be canceled.

=== Tropical Depression Lidy ===
- Tropical depression (MFR)
- Tropical storm (SSHWS)
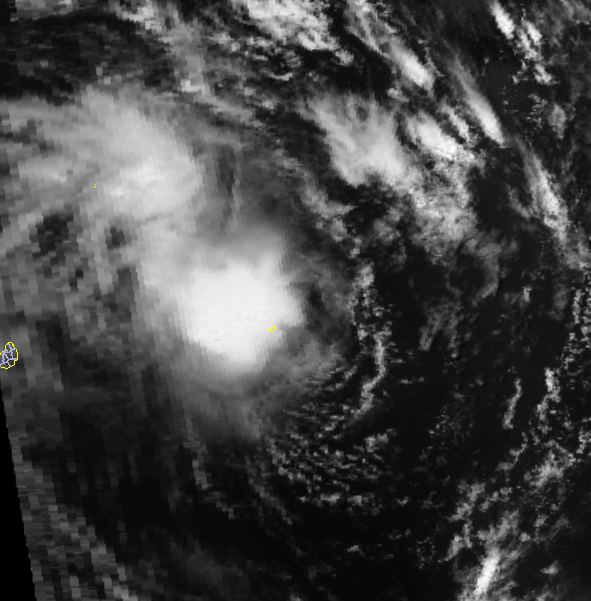
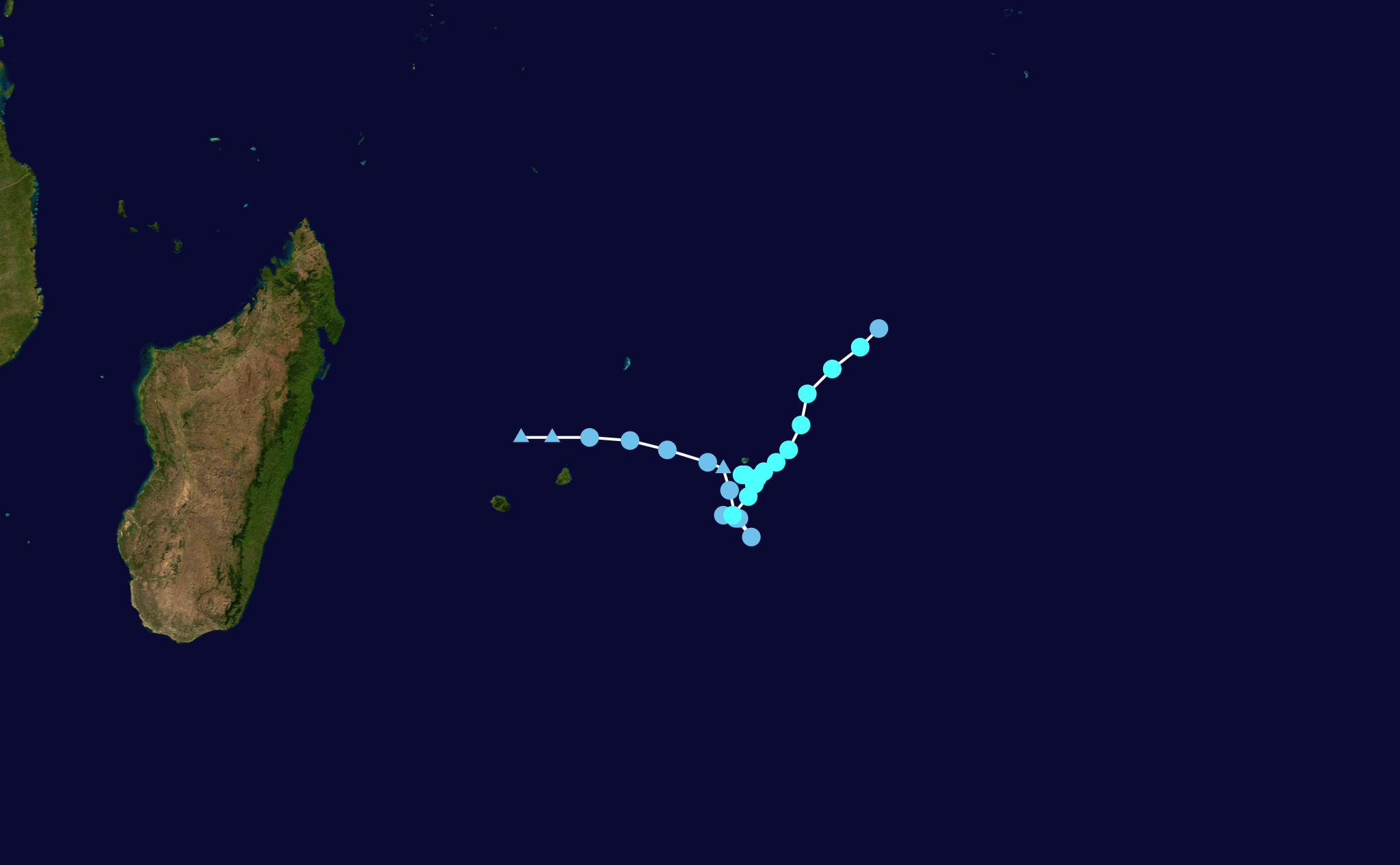
- Duration: March 14 – March 20
- Peak intensity: 55 km/h (35 mph) (10-min); 996 hPa (mbar)

The ITCZ later produced a disturbance northeast of Rodrigues after Kylie dissipated on March 14. It intensified into a tropical depression as it moved southwestward. Due to the threat to Rodrigues, the Mauritius Meteorological Service named the depression Lidy on March 15, although wind shear in the region prevented further strengthening. It produced gusty winds while passing near Rodrigues on March 16, and subsequently looped near the island. Convection from Lidy produced 200 mm (7.9 in) of rainfall, causing flooding in some areas on Rodrigues. The rains caused erosion and the most damage on the island of any storm in the season. Later, Lidy drifted to the west in the trade winds, dissipating on March 20 to the north of Réunion.

=== Intense Tropical Cyclone Marlene ===
- Intense tropical cyclone (MFR)
- Category 4 tropical cyclone (SSHWS)
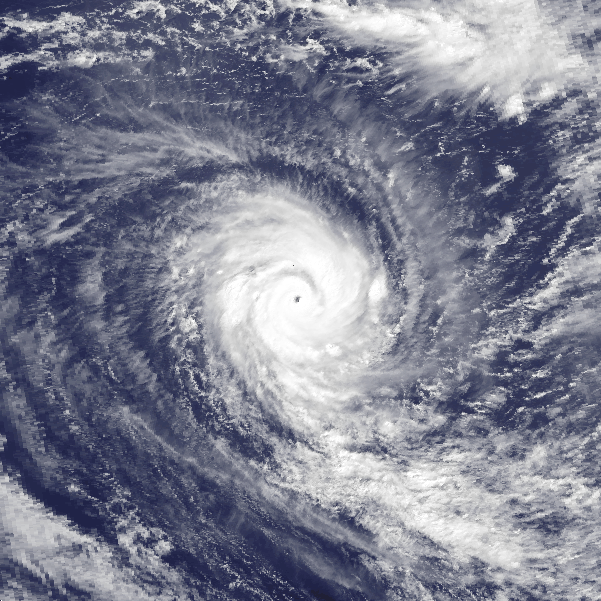
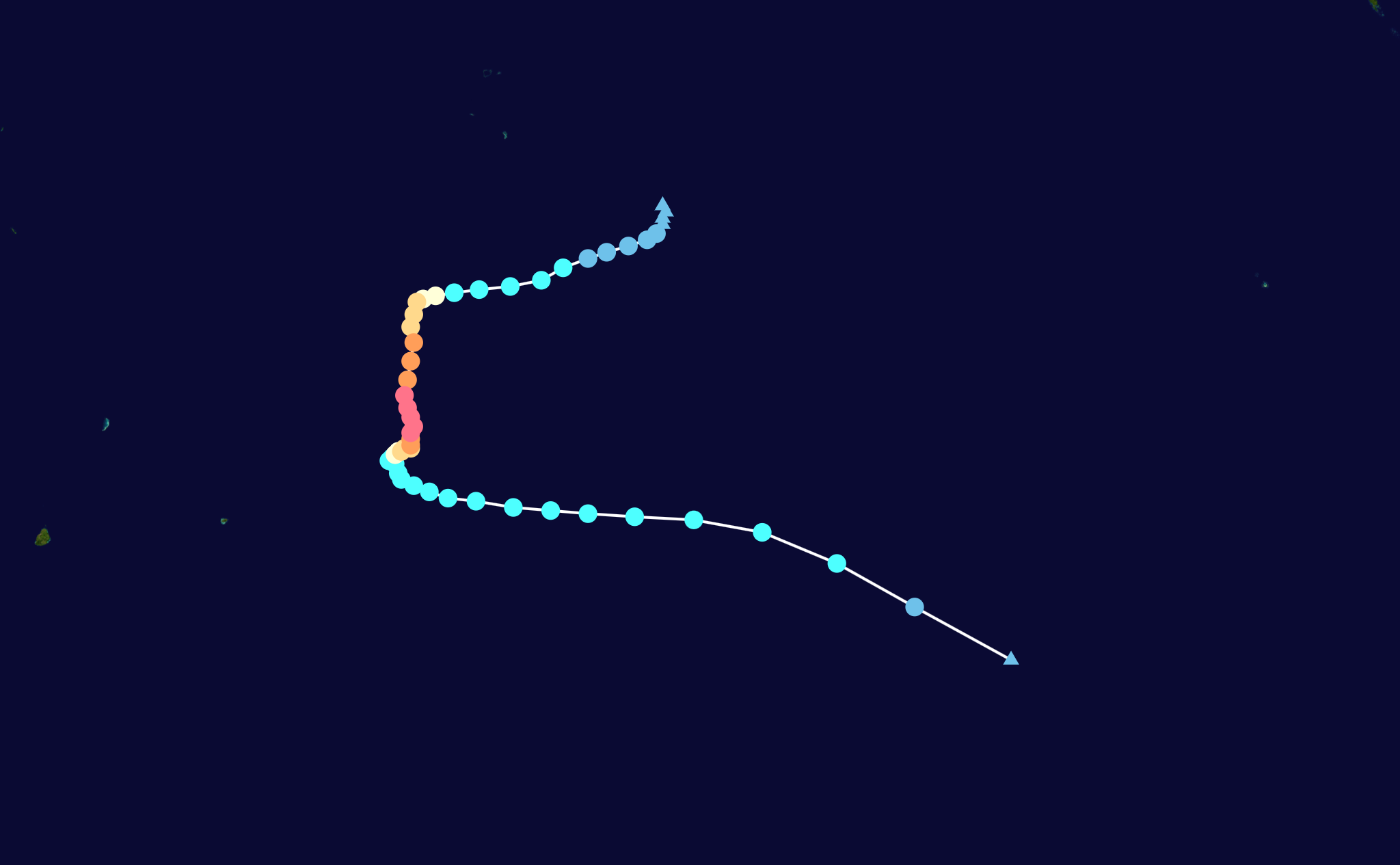
- Duration: March 29 – April 11
- Peak intensity: 185 km/h (115 mph) (10-min); 920 hPa (mbar)

The final storm of the season formed on March 29 from the ITCZ to the east of Diego Garcia. The large area of convection quickly became more organized, intensifying into Tropical Storm Marlene on March 30. On that date, the JTWC classified it as Tropical Cyclone 19S. Marlene continued to strengthen as it moved west-southwestward, aided by a surge in the monsoon. An eye formed on March 31, and on the next day the storm became a tropical cyclone. The eye reached a diameter of 25 km (15 mi), embedded within a well-defined central dense overcast. Later on April 1, Marlene became an intense tropical cyclone, just three days after its genesis. That day, it turned to the south due to a passing trough. Less favorable conditions caused Marlene to weaken on April 2, although it re-intensified the next day. The MFR estimated peak winds of 185 km/h (115 mph), and the JTWC estimated winds of 230 km/h (145 mph). The trough that turned it to the south later caused the cyclone to weaken and for the eye to dissipate. On April 5, Marlene was downgraded into a severe tropical storm and subsequently drifted to the northwest, influenced by a ridge behind the trough. Two days later, the storm turned to the southeast and later to the east, gradually weakening into a tropical depression. On April 11, a passing trough absorbed Marlene in the eastern periphery of the basin.

=== Other systems ===
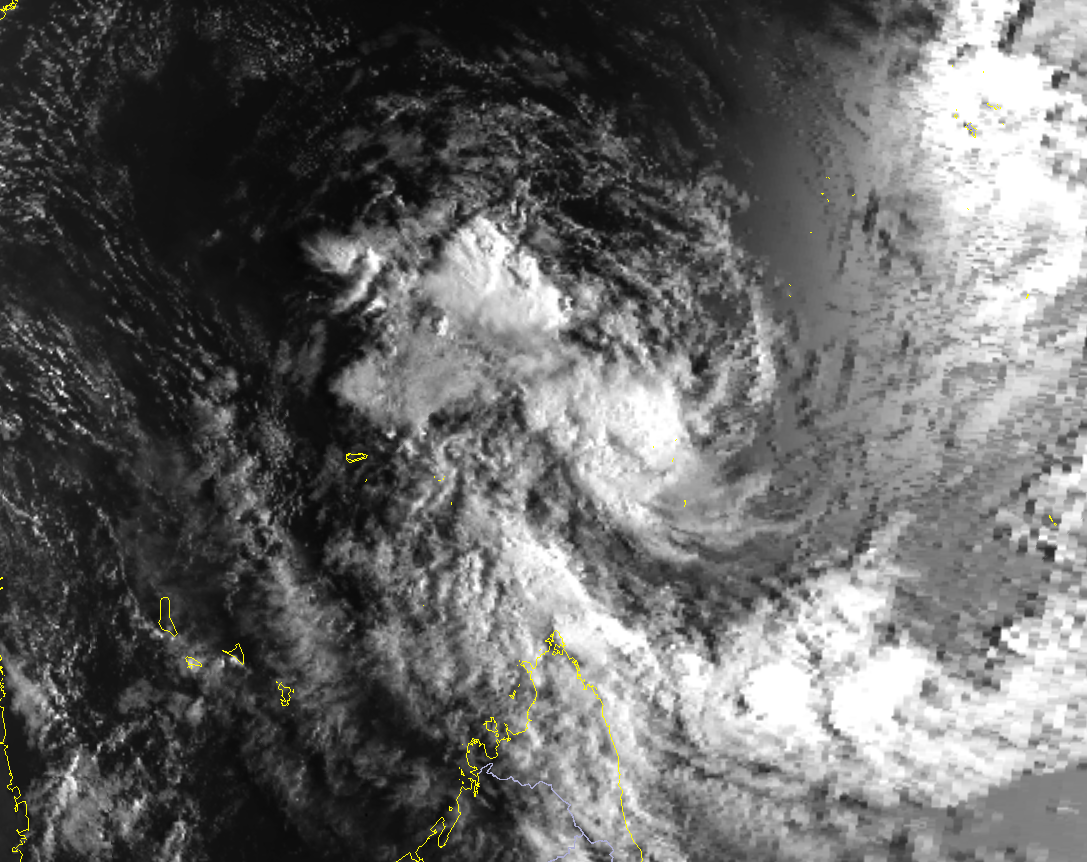
Satellite image of Tropical Depression A1

On October 1, an area of convection developed about 500 km (310 mi) Seychelles at a low latitude. Moving southwestward, the system organized into Tropical Disturbance A1 on October 2, the first of the season. A small central dense overcast subsequently developed over the circulation. A ridge to the south steered the disturbance westward, bringing it just north of the Farquhar Group. On October 5, the disturbance intensified into a tropical depression, reaching peak winds of 55 km/h (35 mph). Subsequently, increased wind shear dissipated the convection as the rapidly weakening depression passed north of Madagascar. On October 7, the circulation dissipated. There were two other disturbances between October and late November.

There was a tropical disturbance in the first two weeks of January before Dorina formed. Later in the month, the ITCZ spawned an area of convection in the northern Mozambique Channel near the Comoros. A circulation formed within the system on January 20 near the western coast of Madagascar, quickly becoming a tropical depression. That day, the Meteorological Service of Madagascar named the system Eliceca, but the depression quickly moved inland and dissipated. Two disturbances formed in February after the development of Heida and before Ingrid formed.

== Storm names ==
A tropical disturbance is named when it reaches moderate tropical storm strength. If a tropical disturbance reaches moderate tropical storm status west of 55°E, then the Sub-regional Tropical Cyclone Advisory Centre in Madagascar assigns the appropriate name to the storm. If a tropical disturbance reaches moderate tropical storm status between 55°E and 90°E, then the Sub-regional Tropical Cyclone Advisory Centre in Mauritius assigns the appropriate name to the storm. A new annual list is used every year, so no names are retired.

- Albertine
- Bentha
- Christelle
- Dorina
- Eliceca
- Fodah
- Gail
- Heida
- Ingrid
- Josta
- Kylie
- Lidy
- Marlene
- Natashia (unused)
- Ortelle (unused)
- Paulette (unused)
- Raisa (unused)
- Sabrina (unused)
- Theresa (unused)
- Vicky (unused)
- Wilhelmine (unused)
- Yvonne (unused)

== See also ==
- List of Southern Hemisphere tropical cyclone seasons
- Atlantic hurricane seasons: 1994, 1995
- Pacific hurricane seasons: 1994, 1995
- Pacific typhoon seasons: 1994, 1995
- North Indian Ocean cyclone seasons: 1994, 1995
