= Ansaldo Doria =

Ansaldo Doria (fl. 12th century) was a Genoese statesman and commander of the noble Doria family. His father was possibly named Genoaldo.

He served several terms as a Genoese consul in the period 1134–1160. During his 1147 consulship, he was elected with three of his co-consuls to lead a force against the Almoravids in Almería, Genoa having been called upon by the Pope to aid in relieving the city from Muslim control. Spearheaded by Castile, the siege that followed lasted three months from August till 17 October 1147, when the city was taken.

In 1157, he was sent with Guglielmo Vento to Sicily to negotiate a treaty with King William I. The aim of this was to see that Genoese interests in the Mezzogiorno be protected, and that their access to major ports such as those at Messina and Palermo be secured. These privileges were granted on the understanding that Genoese goods be subject to tariffs.

Ansaldo makes his final appearance in records in 1174. How long he lived beyond this point is unclear. He had three known sons: Enrico, Guglielmo, and Simone. Though numerous genealogists report that he was married to Anna Grimaldi, daughter of Niccolò, there are no contemporary documents to substantiate this.
