= Oriana Fallaci: The Journalist, the Agitator, the Legend =

2013 book by Cristina De Stefano

- Author: Cristina De Stefano
- Original title: Oriana. Una donna
- Translator: Marina Harss
- Language: Italian
- Subject: Oriana Fallaci
- Genre: biography
- Publisher: Rizzoli
- Publication date: 13 October 2013
- Publication place: Italy
- English publication date: 17 October 2017
- Pages: 312
- ISBN: 9788817068987

Oriana Fallaci: The Journalist, the Agitator, the Legend (Italian: Oriana. Una donna, lit. 'Oriana: A Woman') is a biography of the Italian journalist and writer Oriana Fallaci. It was written by Cristina De Stefano and published by Rizzoli in 2013.

== Summary ==
The book covers Oriana Fallaci's life, beginning with her teenage years and partisan activities during World War II. The height of her career as a journalist was in the 1960s and 1970s, when she became known and influential for using a distinctive reportorial voice and interviewing major figures of international politics. The book goes into Fallaci's love life and her tendency for overstatements. The book tells about Fallaci's life based on archival material, unpublished personal testimonies and interviews with her friends and colleagues, who often gave contradictory accounts.

== Reception ==
John Domini of The Washington Post said the book "rises to the challenges" of covering Fallaci's dramatic life and that the English translation by Marina Harss, published by Other Press in 2017, "never lacks for clarity". Publishers Weekly called it "an intimate investigation into a larger-than-life personality who, in the end, was just another lonely soul". Dwight Garner of The New York Times wrote that the book "is not particularly well-written or thoughtful but it gets [Fallaci's] story onto the page and, thanks to its subject, is never dull".
