= Simone Doria (admiral) =

Genoese Crusader

Simone or Simon Doria (born c. 1135) was a Genoese merchant, politician, and admiral, a member of the powerful Doria family. He was the son of Ansaldo Doria and Anna Grimaldi. He was elected consul six times between 1175 and 1188. Having been elected admiral in 1189, he led a naval fleet in support of the troops of Philip Augustus at the Siege of Acre in 1190. In 1219 he led the Genoese fleet in the Siege of Damietta. He left three known sons: Andrea, who married into the ruling family of Logudoro; Pietro, who fought with his father at Damietta; and Niccolò.
