= List of storms named Dean =

The name Dean was used for five tropical cyclones in the Atlantic Ocean.

- Tropical Storm Dean (1983), struck the coast of Virginia, causing minor erosion and flooding
- Hurricane Dean (1989), passed over Bermuda, causing $8.9 million in damage and 16 injuries
- Tropical Storm Dean (1995), caused significant flooding damage to Chambers County, Texas, but 1 death
- Tropical Storm Dean (2001), caused $7.7 million in damage to Puerto Rico and minimal damage to the U.S. Virgin Islands
- Hurricane Dean (2007), a Cape-Verde hurricane that made landfall in the Yucatan Peninsula at Category 5 strength

The name was retired after 2007, and was replaced by Dorian in the 2013 season.

In the Southeastern Indian Ocean:

- Cyclone Dean (1980), which struck Western Australia and caused substantial damage to Port Hedland
