= List of storms named Dorian =

The name Dorian was used for two tropical cyclones in the Atlantic Ocean. Dorian replaced Dean following the latter's retirement after the 2007 season:

- Tropical Storm Dorian (2013) – affected the Bahamas and Florida.
- Hurricane Dorian (2019) – a Category 5 hurricane that became the costliest hurricane to affect the Bahamas and the strongest landfalling Atlantic hurricane in terms of maximum sustained winds.

Dorian was retired after its 2019 usage, and was replaced by Dexter for the 2025 season.

== See also ==
Similar names that have been used for tropical cyclones:

- Cyclone Darian (2022) – used in the Australian region.
