= Tropical Storm Dean (1995) =

Atlantic tropical storm

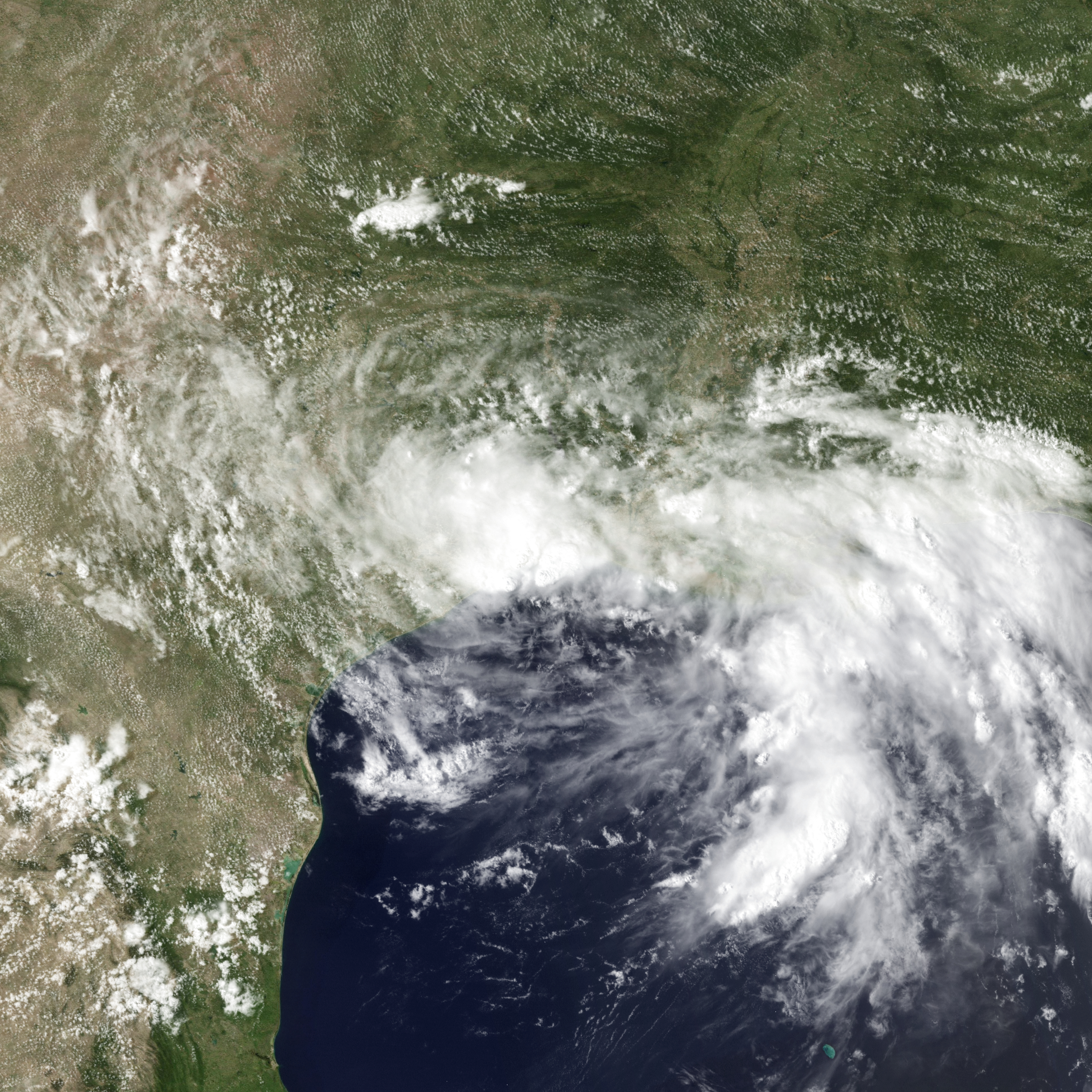
- Tropical Storm Dean making landfall In Texas at peak intensity on July 30

Meteorological history
- Formed: July 28, 1995
- Dissipated: August 2, 1995

Tropical storm
- 1-minute sustained (SSHWS/NWS)
- Highest winds: 45 mph (75 km/h)
- Lowest pressure: 999 mbar (hPa); 29.50 inHg

Overall effects
- Fatalities: 1 indirect
- Damage: $500,000 (1995 USD)
- Areas affected: East Texas
- IBTrACS
- Part of the 1995 Atlantic hurricane season

Tropical Storm Dean was a short-lived storm that formed in late July 1995 and lasted into early August. It was the fourth named storm of the 1995 Atlantic hurricane season. It spent most of its life as a tropical depression, and briefly gained tropical storm status before its landfall on the Texas coast on July 30. After landfall, it dissipated over central Texas on August 2. The impacts from Dean were minimal, mainly due to heavy rain in Oklahoma and Texas that caused localized coastal and inland flooding. Two F0 tornadoes touched down in Texas as a result of Dean's landfall. Also, 20 families had to be evacuated in Chambers County, due to flooding in the area. One fatality was recorded as a result of flooding in Oklahoma. Several highways were flooded out in Oklahoma, which impeded travel in the state. In addition approximately $500,000 (1995 U.S. dollars) worth of damage was recorded in the aftermath of Dean.

== Meteorological history ==
Map plotting the storm's track and intensity, according to the Saffir–Simpson scale Map key Saffir–Simpson scale Tropical depression (≤38 mph, ≤62 km/h) Tropical storm (39–73 mph, 63–118 km/h) Category 1 (74–95 mph, 119–153 km/h) Category 2 (96–110 mph, 154–177 km/h) Category 3 (111–129 mph, 178–208 km/h) Category 4 (130–156 mph, 209–251 km/h) Category 5 (≥157 mph, ≥252 km/h) Unknown Storm type Tropical cyclone Subtropical cyclone Extratropical cyclone, remnant low, tropical disturbance, or monsoon depression

The precursor system that would form Dean was a stationary front situated in the northeastern Gulf of Mexico in the last week of July. On July 27, it developed a weak upper-level circulation indicated by reports from buoys in the Gulf, its structure was disorganized but was in the process of organizing. The system continued to organize early on July 28, and that afternoon it developed a surface circulation. The tropical depression that spawned Dean was thought to have formed at around 1800 UTC, July 28. It was later declared Tropical Depression Four that same day with the center located about 345 miles (555 km) southeast of New Orleans.

At first, the depression slowly tracked westward because it was blocked by a ridge of high pressure to the north. The system was under frequent reconnaissance surveillance, and the depression remained poorly organized and continued to be at tropical depression status well into July 29. The organization of the system hindered further development despite favorable conditions with low wind shear and warm sea surface temperatures. Late on July 29, the system began to execute a turn to the northwest with an increase in forward speed. It still remained a poorly organized tropical depression south of Louisiana.

On July 30, the system's circulation began to organize and the first reports of tropical storm-force squalls were reported as it moved closer to the Texas coast. Based on this the National Hurricane Center (NHC) issued tropical storm warnings for much of the Texas and Louisiana coast, from Intracoastal City, Louisiana to Corpus Christi, Texas. Later that afternoon it strengthened into Tropical Storm Dean while located just 70 mi (110 km) off the coast. The Hurricane Hunters confirmed that Dean strengthened in the final hours before its landfall on the Texas coast to a 45 mph (75 km/h) storm, and made landfall near Freeport, Texas at 8:30 pm CDT (0130 UTC) July 31. Shortly after its landfall, Dean weakened back to tropical depression strength as it tracked further northwest into Texas. The depression stalled in central Texas on August 1 and remained there for 36 hours until the next day, dropping heavy rain over parts of the state. Late on August 2, it merged with a non-tropical front and dissipated.

The remnants of Dean eventually moved up into Oklahoma, where it caused heavy rainfall, forcing roads to close and rescues to be made. Dean also dropped heavy rain across the Midwest states as well. Some areas in Kansas received more than seven inches of rain. Illinois, Missouri, and Indiana each had areas that received more than 5 inches (127 mm) of rain from Dean.

== Preparations ==
Because of Dean's proximity to land upon formation, there was little warning in advance of the storm. Tropical storm warnings were issued at 0300 UTC on July 30 from Intracoastal City, Louisiana to Corpus Christi, Texas. The warnings were up for 23 hours before landfall, and were allowed to expire at 0300 UTC July 31.

== Impact ==
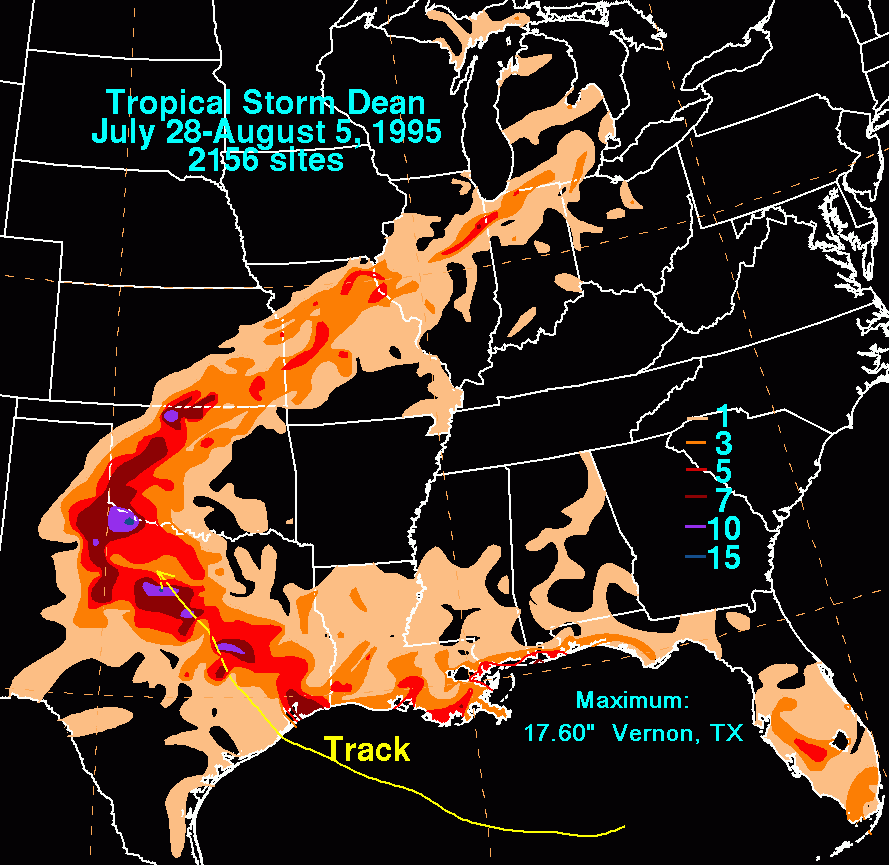
Rainfall from Dean

Most of the damage from Dean was concentrated in the states of Texas and Oklahoma. The damage, if any, was mainly due to the heavy rain across both states. The total cost of the damage totaled to $500,000 (1995 USD; $707,000 2008 USD).

=== Texas ===
In Texas, most of the damage was due to inland flooding. Heavy rainfall of 6 to 18 inches (150 to 450 mm) was reported across a large swath of Texas. The heaviest measured amount was 17.4 inches (426 mm) near Monroe City, Texas. Rainfall amounts of two to six inches were common throughout the eastern part of the state. In total, 38 houses were flooded in southeast Texas. The freshwater flooding resulted in the evacuation of 20 families in Chambers County. 250 people had to evacuate from their homes near Abilene, Texas due to floodwater. The storm surge impacts were fairly minor, ranging from 3 to 5 feet (1.2 to 1.8 m) above mean sea level. A portion of State Highway 87 was flooded from the storm surge, although no significant property damage was reported as a result of it. Minor beach erosion and street flooding was also reported on Galveston Island. The highest wind gust on land was 51 mph (82 km/h) at Scholes Field. There were two tornadoes confirmed as a result of Dean. One touched down on High Island in Galveston County, and the other touched down near Anahuac. Both tornadoes were rated as F0 on the Fujita scale, with minor damage.

=== Oklahoma ===
Oklahoma also saw heavy rain as well from the remnants of Dean. Over 5 inches (130 mm) of rain fell in the town of Stillwater, and the highest amount, 12.07 inches (307 mm), was recorded at Great Salt Plains Dam, Oklahoma. Over 40 homes were flooded in the area by the heavy rain, and about 24 cars were found stranded in high water. Thunderstorms, associated with Dean's remnants, dumped heavy rain across the state, resulting in flash flooding in many areas. The flooding, in many areas, made travel near impossible. U.S. Highway 62 in Jackson County and Highway 5 in Harmon County were both closed due to flash flooding covering their roadways. State Highway 51 was under 1.5 feet (0.46 m) of water at times. Several other roads remained flooded and closed for several days after the arrival of Dean's remnants. One death, a small child, was reported in Hardeman County after the child had been swept away by flood waters.

=== Rest of the United States ===
Other parts of the U.S. received significant rainfall from Dean. Heavy rain was recorded in Louisiana, where 7.04 inches (17.9 cm) of rain fell in Galliano. Coden, Alabama received 6.42 inches (163 mm) of rain, and Waveland, Mississippi got 5.84 inches (148 mm) of rain. Dean cut a swath of heavy rain throughout the Midwest: Kansas, Missouri, Illinois, Indiana, and Michigan were primarily affected. Florida received heavy rainfall as well, with some areas in Central Florida getting as much as five inches of rain.

== See also ==
- Tropical Storm Abby (1964)
- Tropical Storm Danielle (1980)
- Other storms of the same name
- List of Texas hurricanes
- List of wettest tropical cyclones in the United States
- Timeline of the 1995 Atlantic hurricane season
