= 1979–80 Australian region cyclone season =

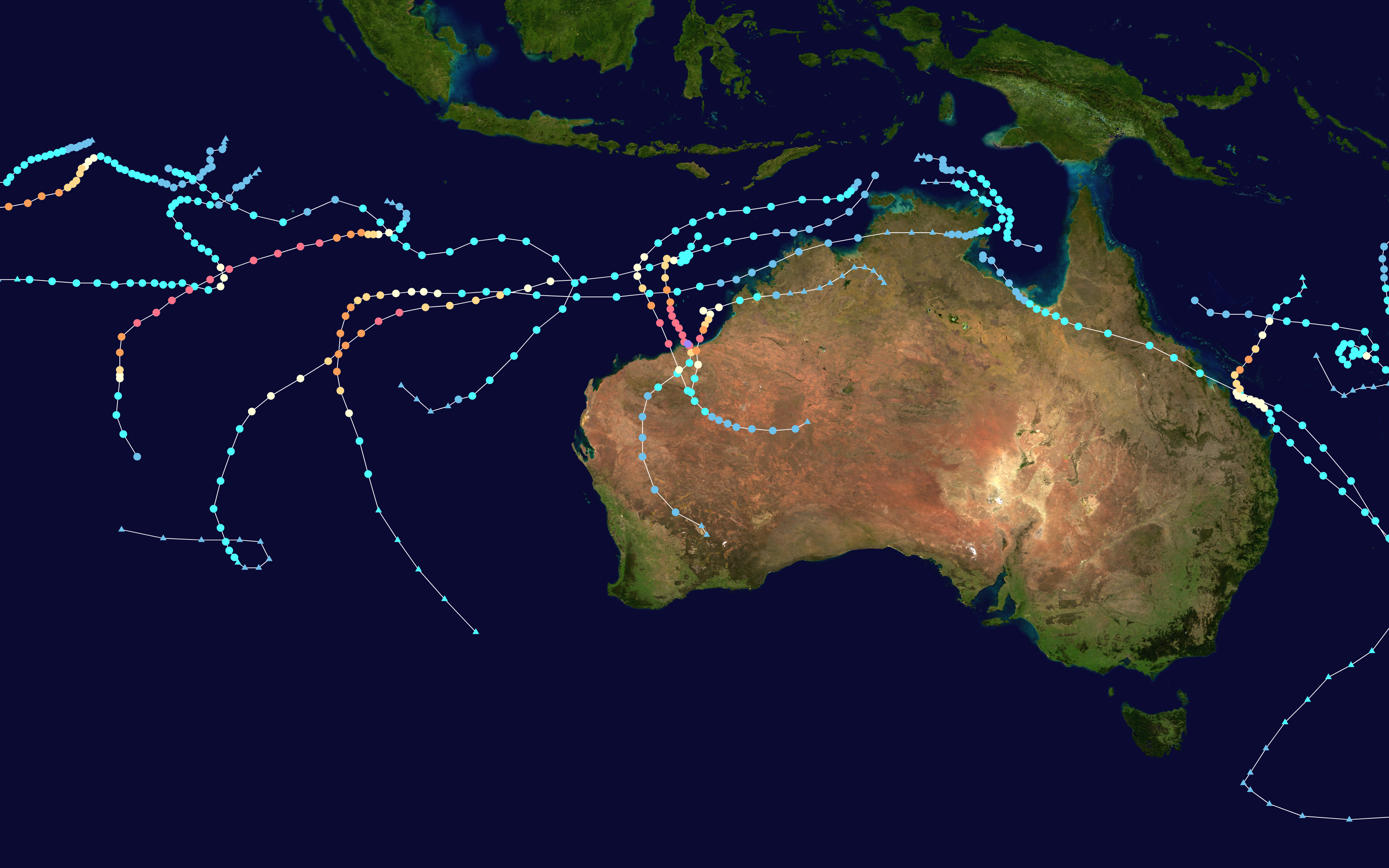
- Season summary map

Seasonal boundaries
- First system formed: 26 August 1979
- Last system dissipated: 31 March 1980

Strongest storm
- Name: Amy
  - Maximum winds: 215 km/h (130 mph) (10-minute sustained)
  - Lowest pressure: 915 hPa (mbar)

Seasonal statistics
- Tropical lows: 15
- Tropical cyclones: 15
- Severe tropical cyclones: 9
- Total fatalities: Unknown
- Total damage: $25 million (1980 USD)

Related articles
- 1979–80 South Pacific cyclone season; 1979–80 South-West Indian Ocean cyclone season

The 1979–80 Australian region cyclone season was an above average tropical cyclone season that was very active. The season featured 15 total cyclones, with 9 of them attaining severe tropical cyclone status. The strongest of these was Cyclone Amy, which ended up making landfall in the north-western portion of Western Australia.

== Systems ==
=== Tropical Cyclone Tony ===
- Category 2 tropical cyclone (Australian scale)
- Tropical storm (SSHWS)
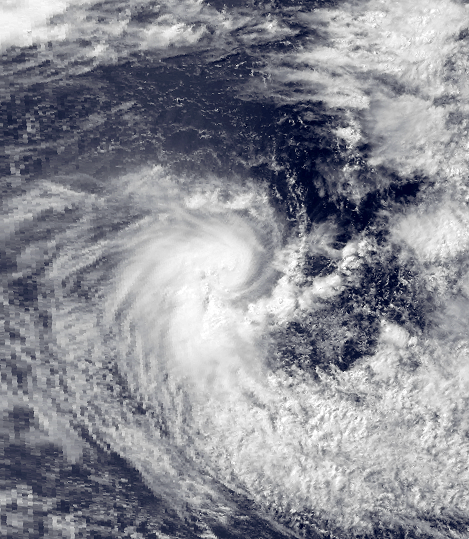
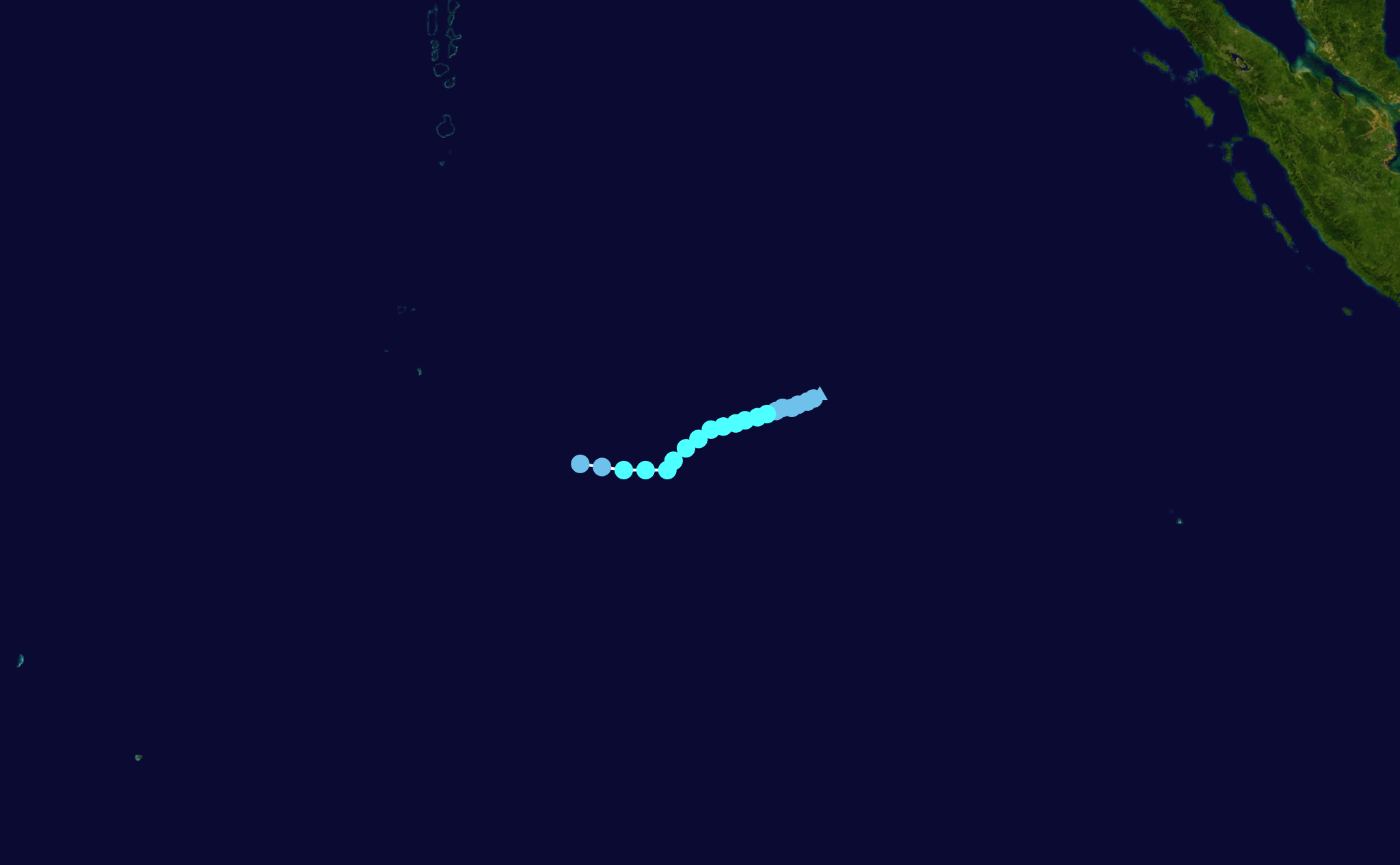
- Duration: 26 August – 30 August (Exited basin)
- Peak intensity: 95 km/h (60 mph) (10-min); 990 hPa (mbar)

On 26 August, TCWC Perth reported that a tropical low had developed on a shear line about 1300 km (810 mi) to the northwest of Cocos Island. Over the next couple of days the depression gradually developed further before at 1800 UTC on 27 August, TCWC Perth estimated that it had become a tropical cyclone and named it Tony. During the next couple of days, the system moved towards the west-southwest before on 29 August it reached its peak intensity of 95 km/h (60 mph) and a peak pressure of 990 hPa (29.23 inHg) as it approached the edge of TCWC Perth's area of responsibility. During the next day, Tony moved into the South West Indian Ocean and weakened gradually before it dissipated during 31 August. Neither the Mauritius or Reunion meteorological services monitored Tony as a tropical cyclone while it was active, while it was not included in the JTWC's analysis of the season.

=== Severe Tropical Cyclone Viola–Claudette ===
- Category 5 severe tropical cyclone (Australian scale)
- Category 3 tropical cyclone (SSHWS)
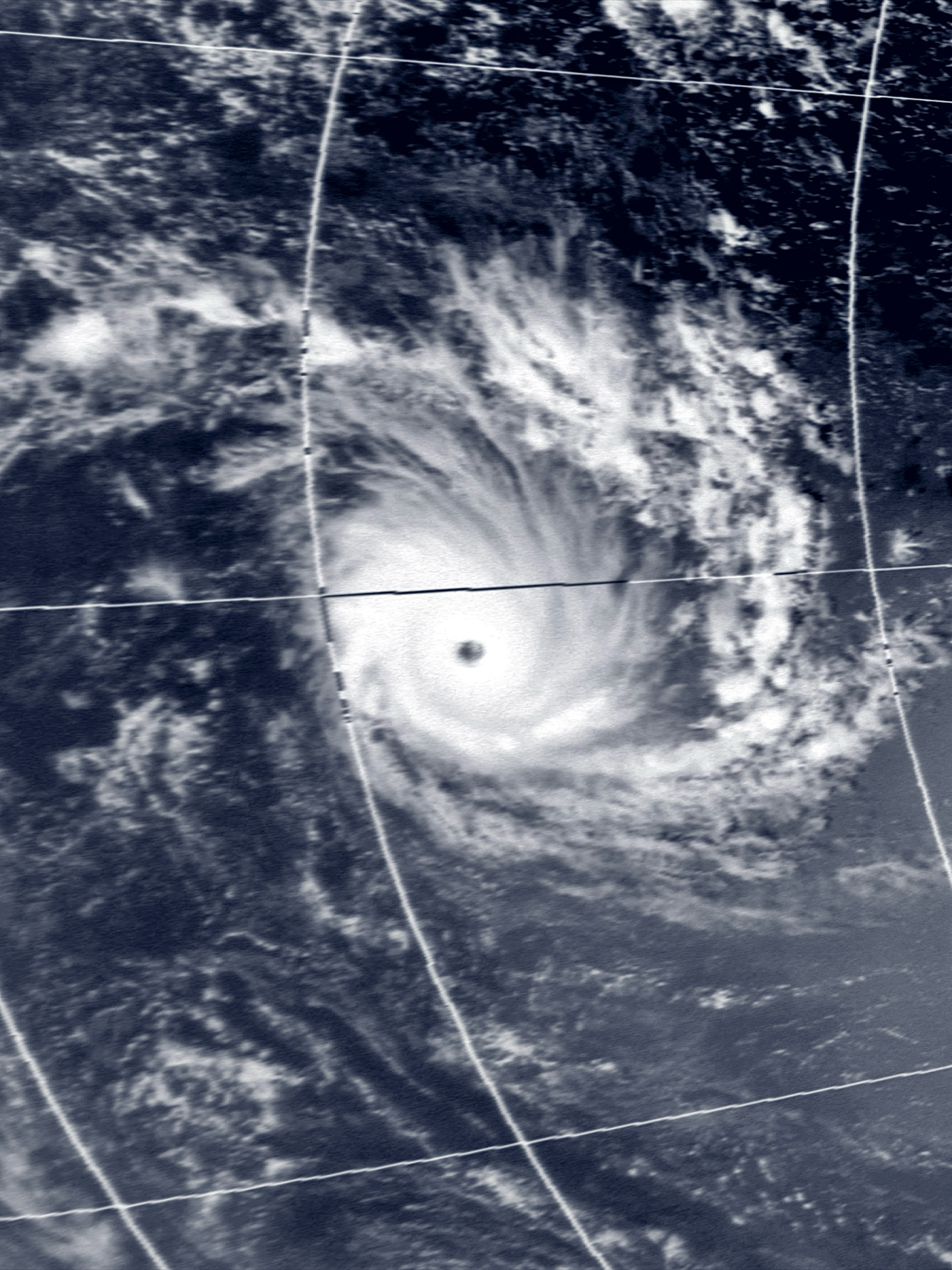
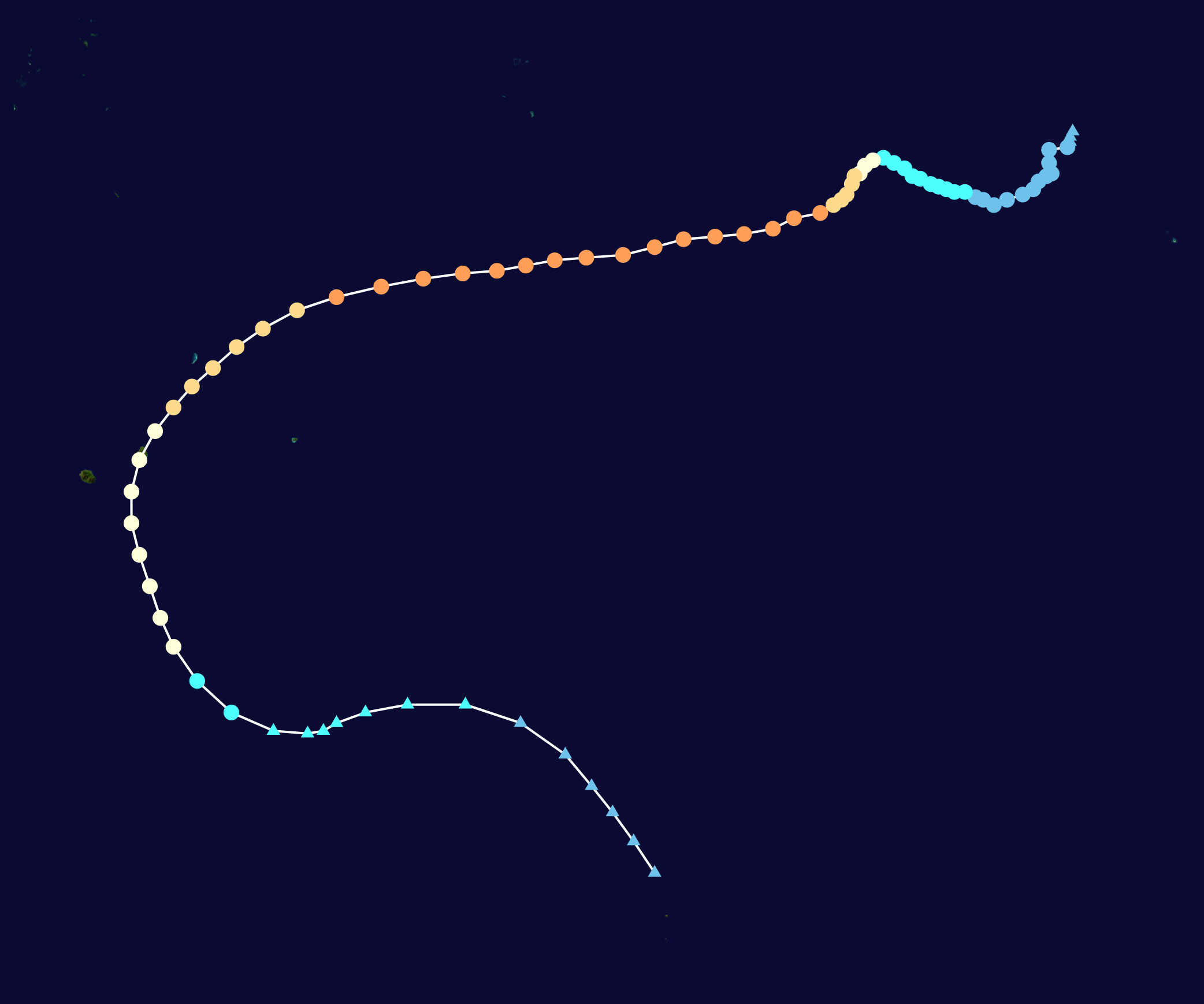
- Duration: 9 December – 18 December (Crossed 80°E)
- Peak intensity: 205 km/h (125 mph) (10-min); 930 hPa (mbar)

The disturbance from which Viola developed formed on 7 December about 600 km (375 mi) northwest of Cocos. A tropical depression developed on 9 December, moved slowly southwestward, and strengthened into Cyclone Viola two days later. It then moved westward under the influence of an easterly middle level flow north of the sub-tropical ridge, and attained its maximum intensity on 16 December 1979, with a maximum mean wind speed of about 205 km/h (125 mph) and an estimated central pressure of 930 mbar (27.46 inHg). Early on 18 December, Viola crossed 80° E and was renamed Claudette.

=== Severe Tropical Cyclone Wilf–Danitza ===
- Category 3 severe tropical cyclone (Australian scale)
- Category 1 tropical cyclone (SSHWS)
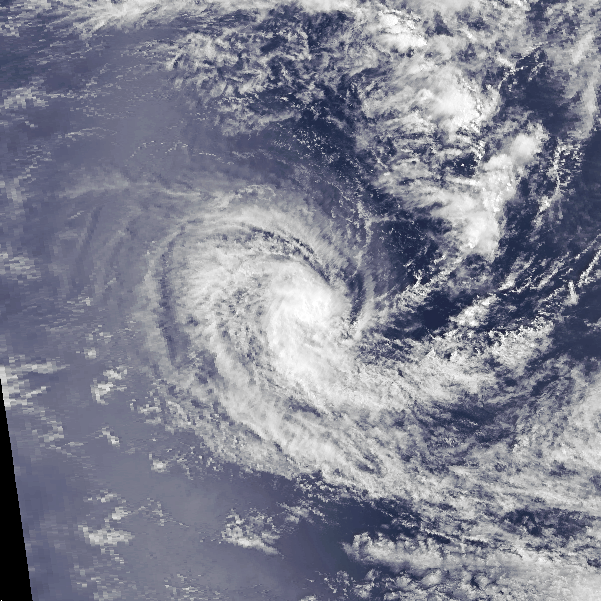
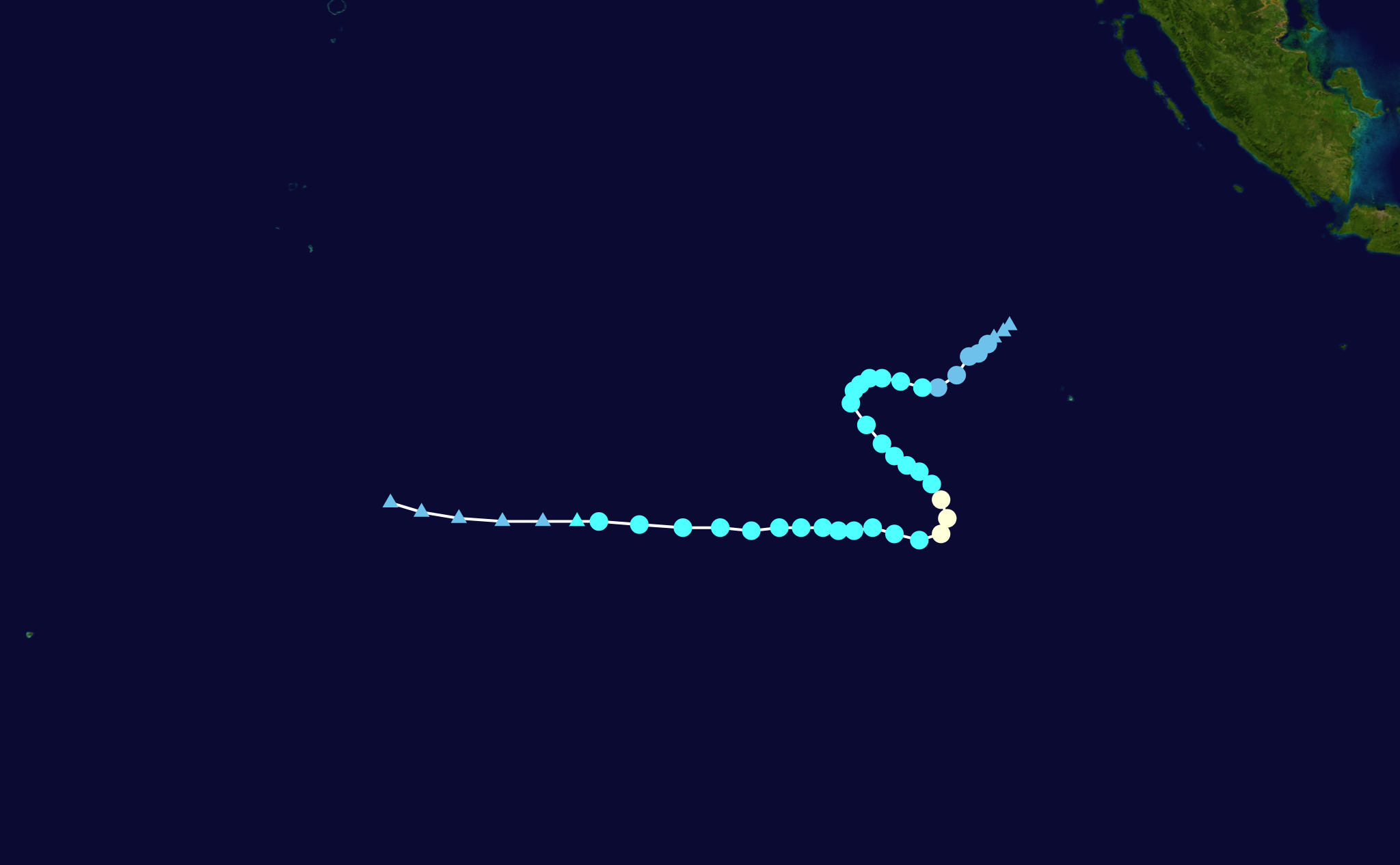
- Duration: 23 December – 2 January (Crossed 80°E)
- Peak intensity: 130 km/h (80 mph) (10-min); 973 hPa (mbar)

The depressional phase of Wilf began about 300 km of the Cocos Island on 23 December 1979. Estimated from satellite pictures, Wilf was recorded as a tropical cyclone early Christmas Day. Wilf began a period of rapid intensification and reached its peak on 28 December. Wilf began to weaken as shear from the northwest began to tear the storm apart. While its convection did weaken a lot, it was still able to maintain tropical cyclone status. The storm crossed into the Southwest Indian Ocean on the first day of 1980, being renamed to Danitza.

=== Tropical Cyclone Paul ===
- Category 1 tropical cyclone (Australian scale)
- Tropical storm (SSHWS)
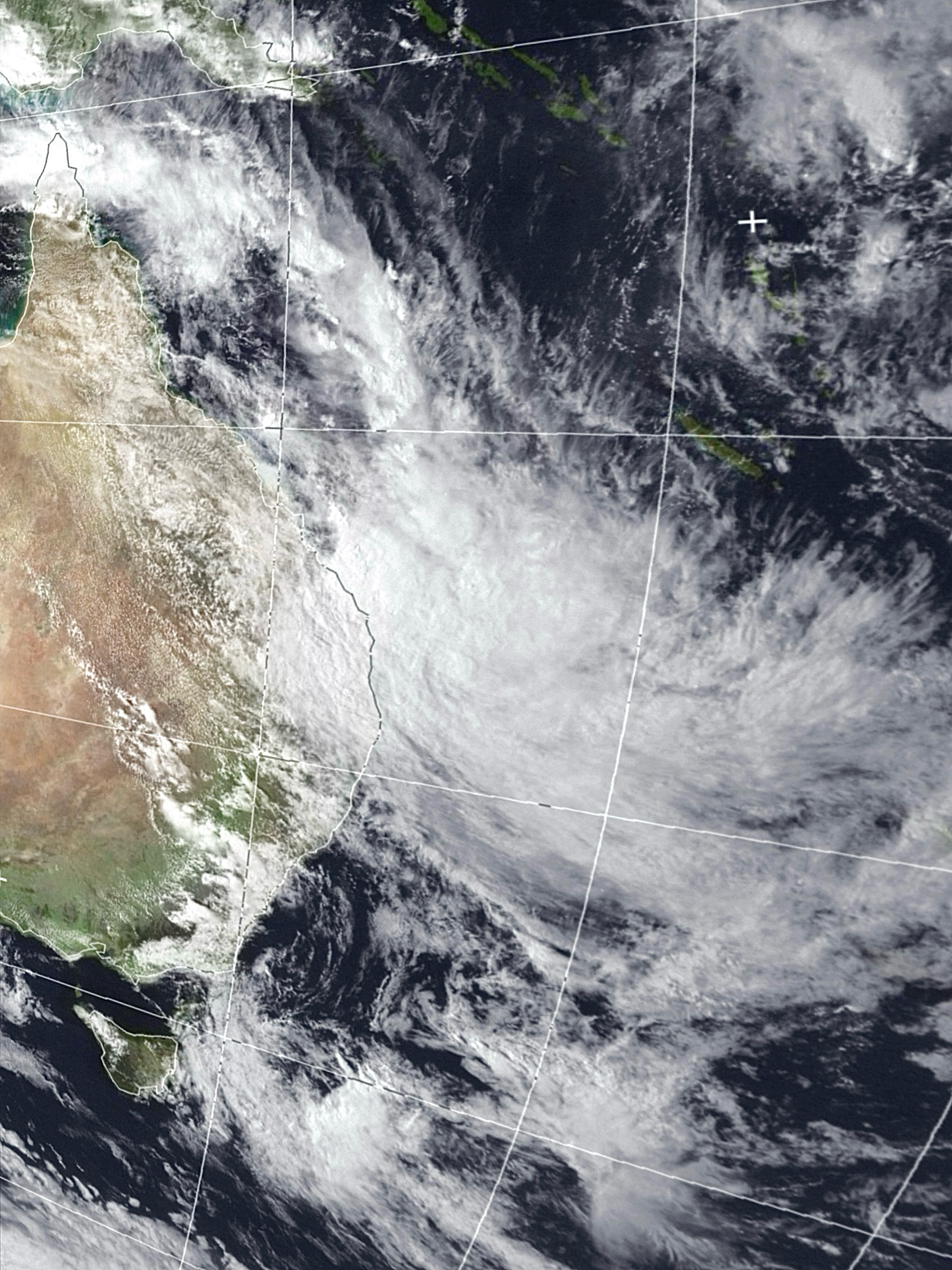
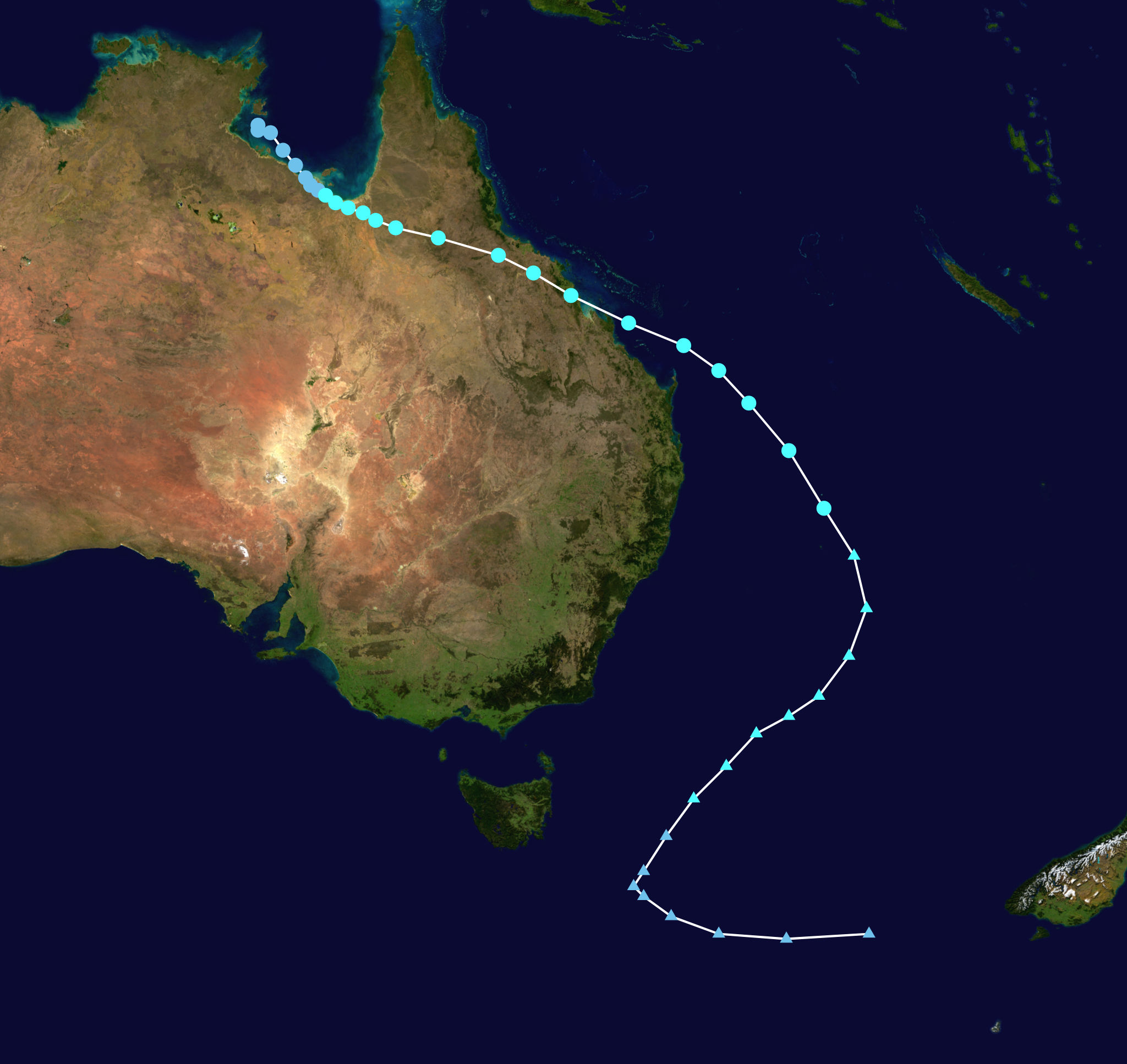
- Duration: 2 January – 12 January
- Peak intensity: 85 km/h (50 mph) (10-min); 990 hPa (mbar)

On 2 January, the BoM reported that a tropical depression had developed in the Southwest Gulf of Carpentaria. During that day the depression moved towards the southwest and developed early signs of having a cyclonic circulation, however before it could intensify into a tropical cyclone, the system made landfall near the Northern Territory border with Queensland at 135°E. Over the next couple of days the depression weakened slightly, as it moved in a general east-southeast direction across the Carpentaria and Central Coast districts of Queensland. On 7 January, the depression moved out into the Coral Sea just to the south of Sarina with a central pressure of 995 hPa. During that day the depression developed gale-force windspeeds and was named as Paul by TCWC Brisbane. Before later that day, Paul reached its peak intensity as a tropical cyclone with 10-minute sustained windspeeds of 75 km/h (45 mph) and its lowest central pressure of 989 hPa as it moved rapidly towards the southeast. This southeastern movement continued until 1200 UTC on 8 January when it slowed down and started to move to the southwest as it developed a cold core and became extratropical. The extratropical remnants of Paul subsequently lingered in the Australian region and peaked with stronger windspeeds than when it was a tropical cyclone. The US Navy's analysis of this system shows that they would have considered Paul a tropical storm with peak 1-minute sustained windspeeds of 110 km/h (70 mph). As a tropical depression, Paul forced a strong area of convergence in the moist airstream onto the tropical Queensland coast. As a result of the moisture, very heavy rain caused one of the highest floods of the 20th Century down the Don River through Bowen. In its lower reaches the river changed its course and washed away two homes and caused several million Australian dollars' worth of damage to the market garden industry.

=== Severe Tropical Cyclone Amy ===
- Category 5 severe tropical cyclone (Australian scale)
- Category 5 tropical cyclone (SSHWS)
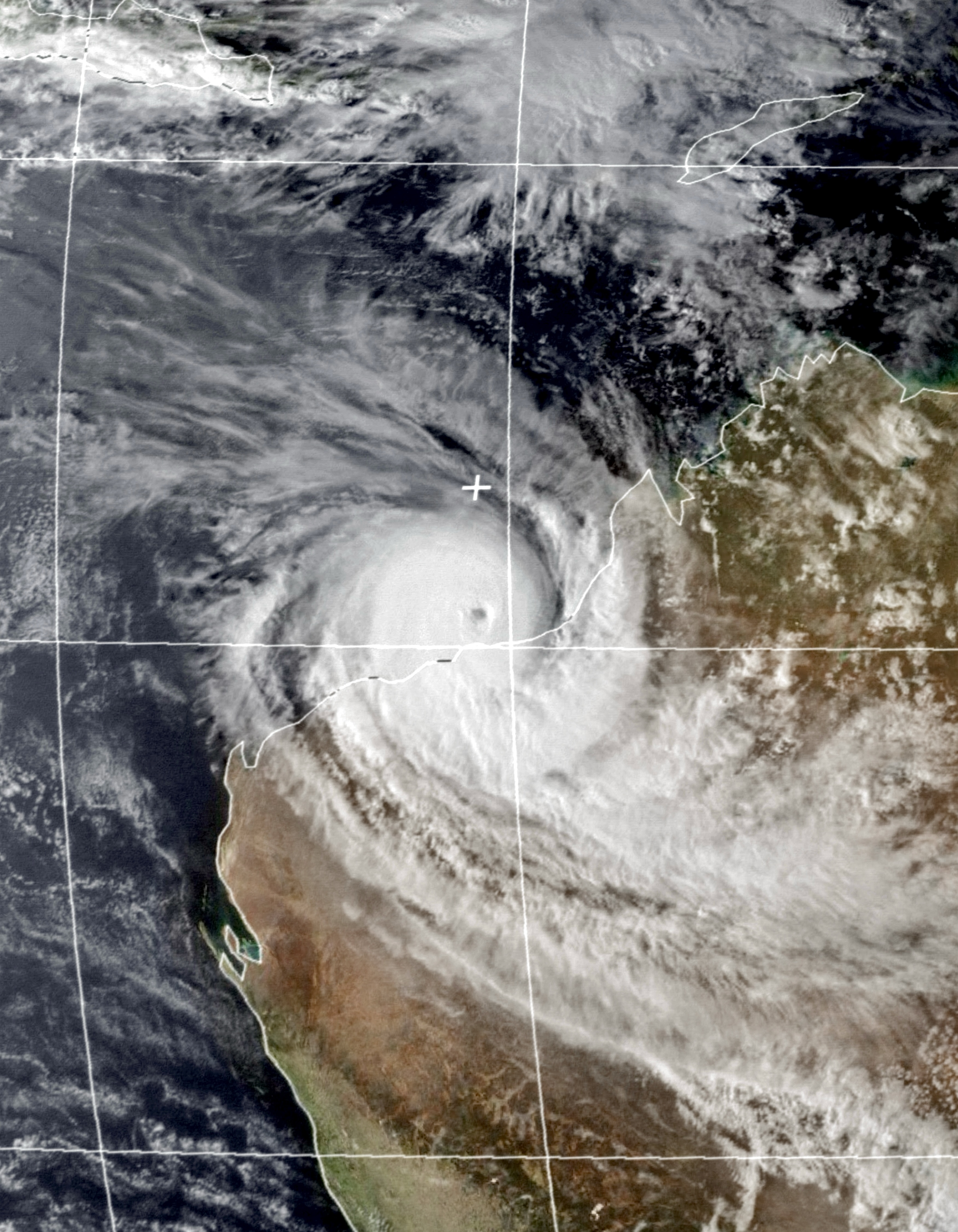
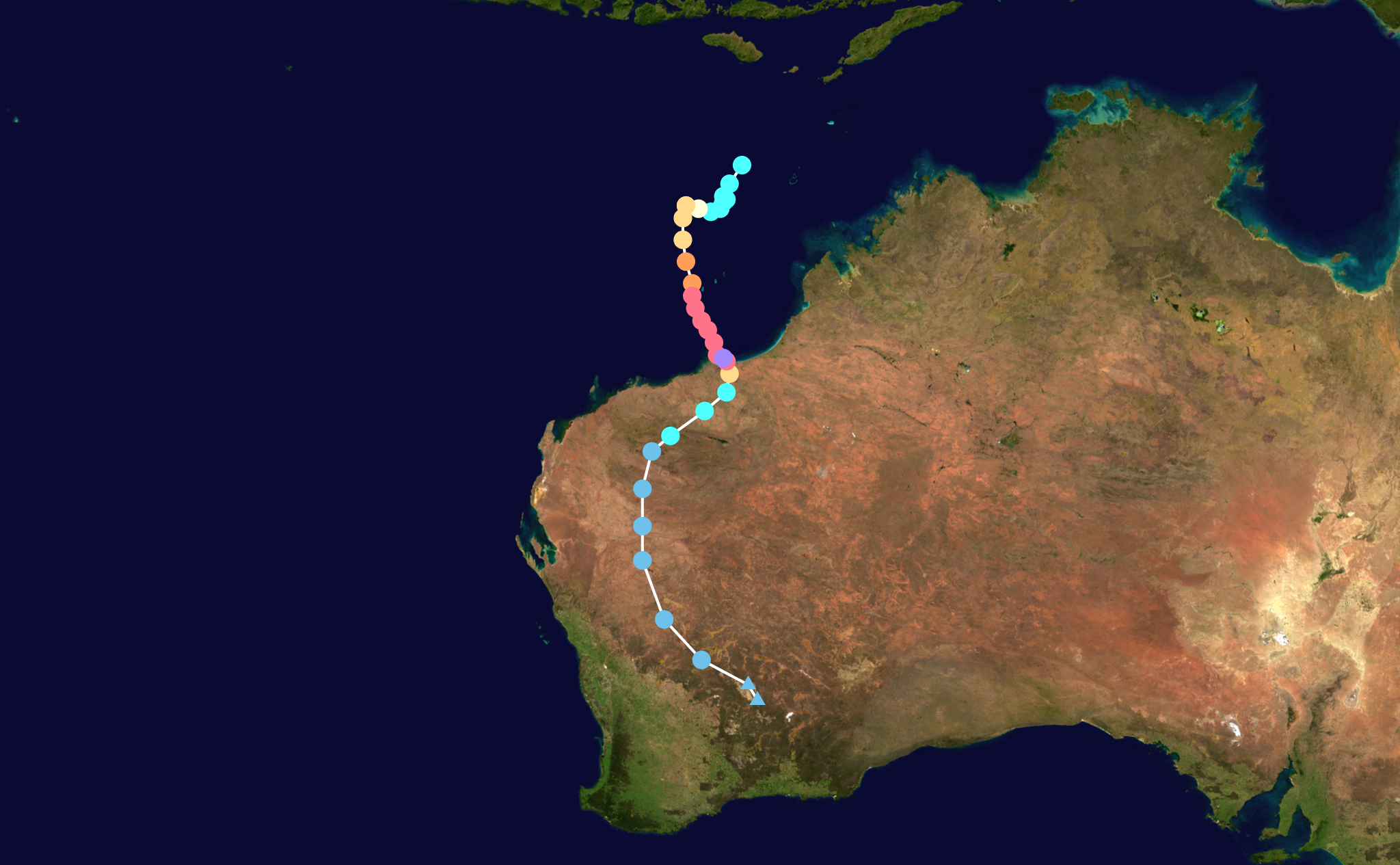
- Duration: 4 January – 12 January
- Peak intensity: 215 km/h (130 mph) (10-min); 915 hPa (mbar)

What would form into Amy began on 3 January 1980 as a collection of clouds located over the Timor Sea, and would drift west-southwest as it reached tropical cyclone status on 5 January. Amy sped towards the south on the 7th, towards Port Hedland. As it approached landfall, it continued to switch direction. Amy made landfall the morning of 10 January about 110 km east of Port Hedland. Amy passed close to the town of Goldsworthy and caused extensive damage. In total, Amy caused around $25 million in damages. No injuries or deaths were reported. The lowest central pressure was 915 hPa.

=== Severe Tropical Cyclone Brian ===
- Category 4 severe tropical cyclone (Australian scale)
- Category 4 tropical cyclone (SSHWS)
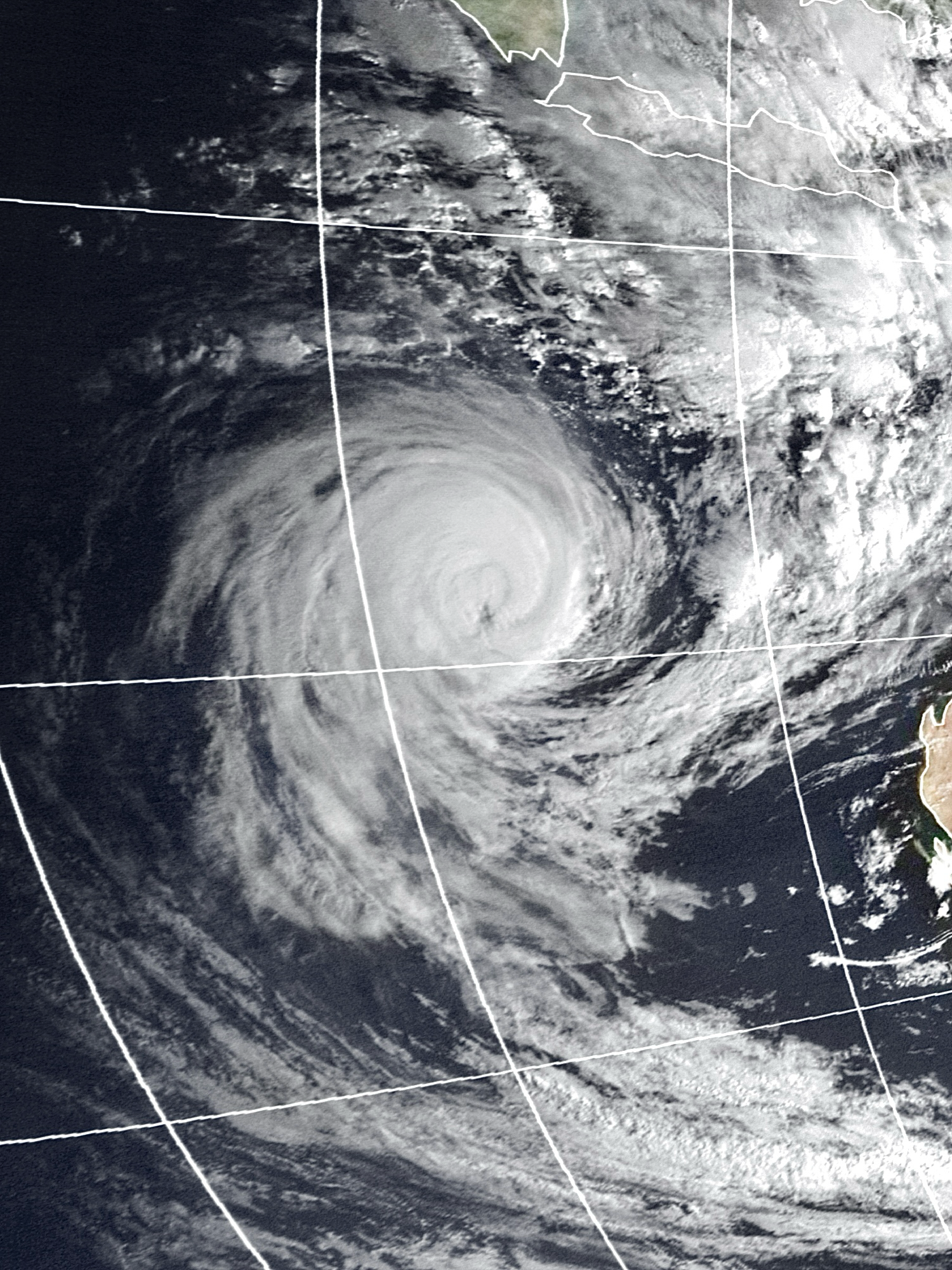
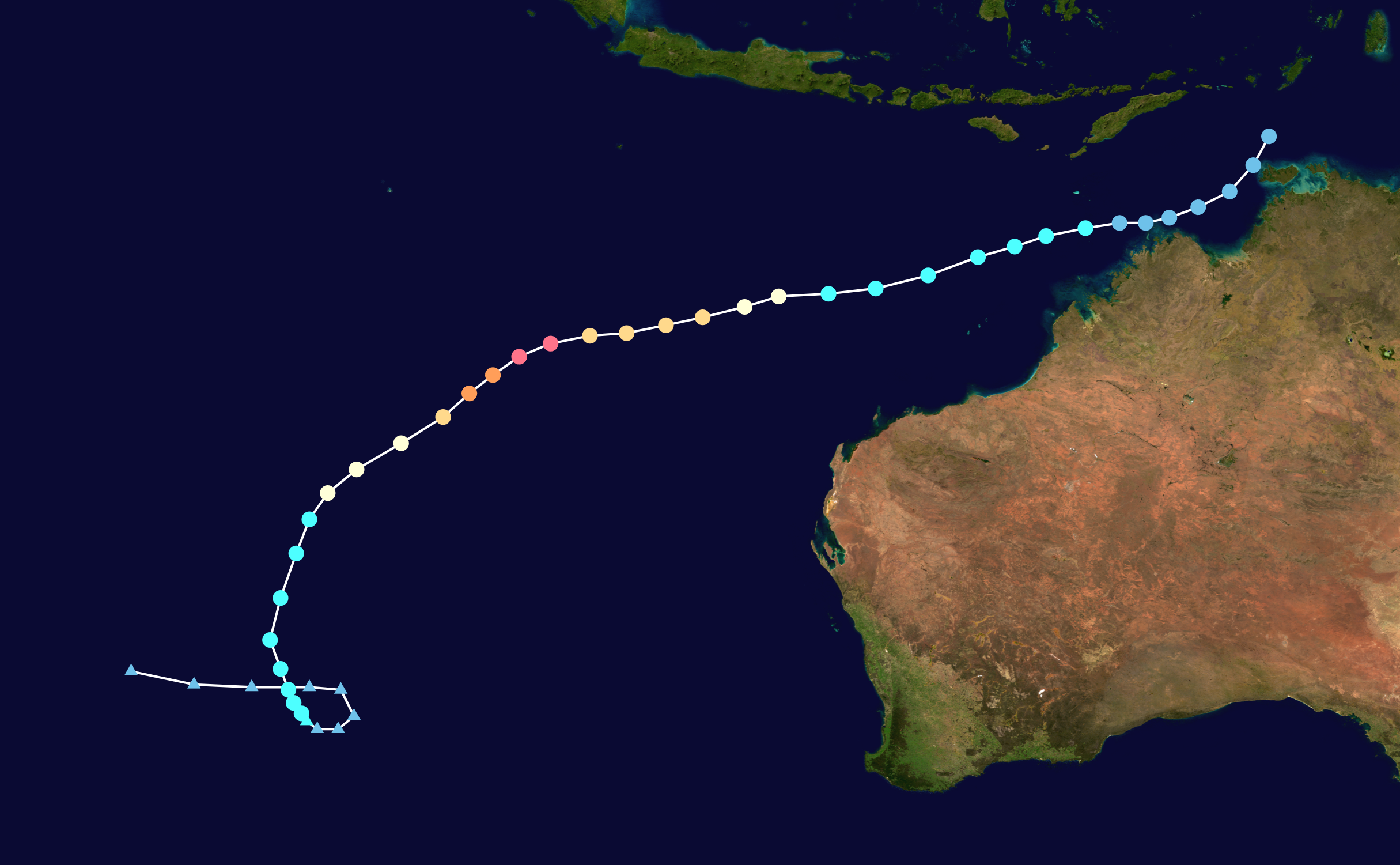
- Duration: 18 January – 27 January
- Peak intensity: 185 km/h (115 mph) (10-min); 930 hPa (mbar)

Brian began as a depression located east of Bathurst Island on 18 January 1980. The system moved west-southwest as it began to rapidly intensify late 19 January. Winds of 110 km/h (70 mph) were recorded 50 km from the eye. Continuing to intensify, Brian reached its peak intensity on 23 January of 185 km/h (115 mph). Brian began to move southwest before dissipating on 27 January.

=== Tropical Cyclone Clara ===
- Category 2 tropical cyclone (Australian scale)
- Tropical storm (SSHWS)
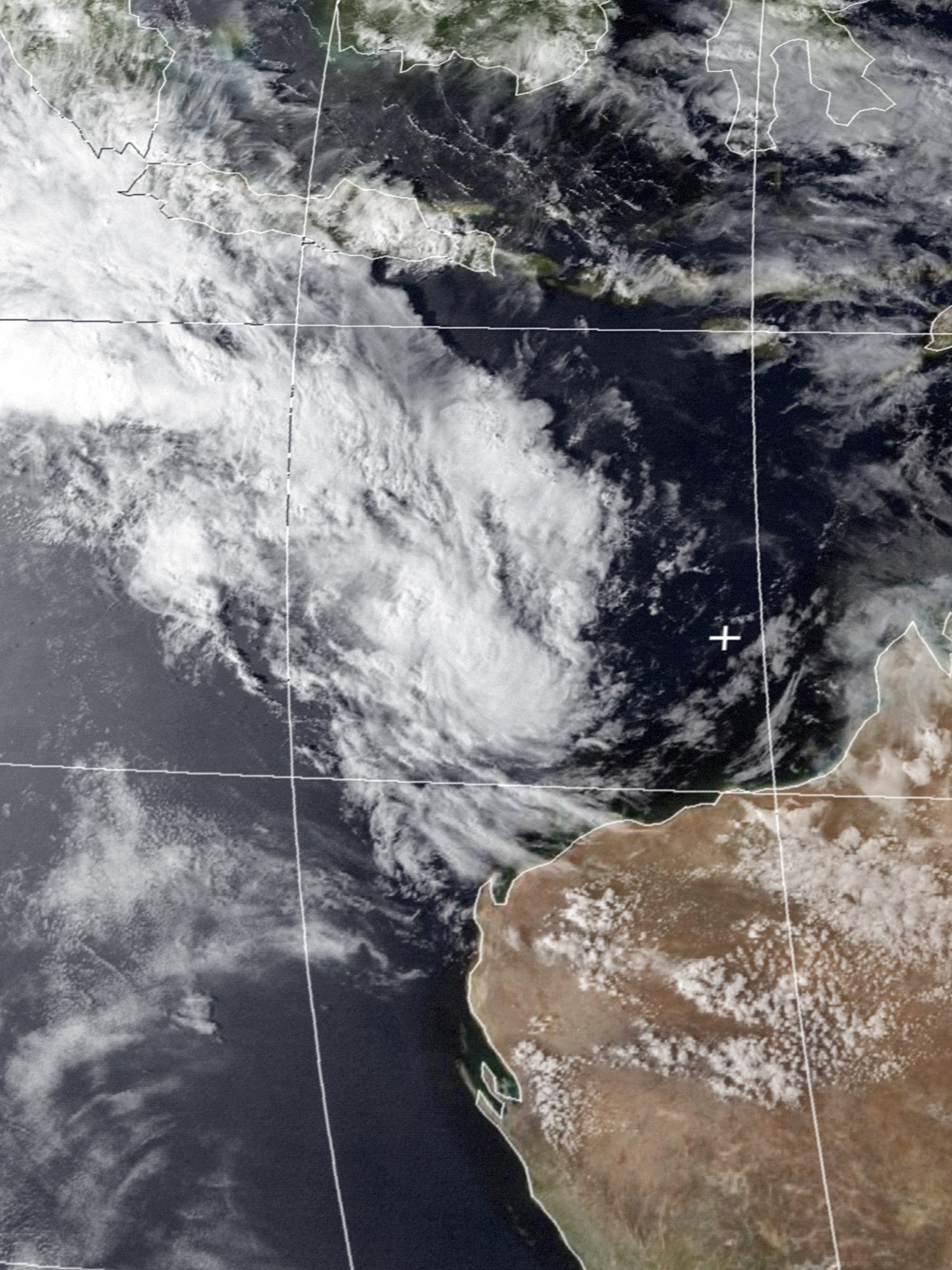
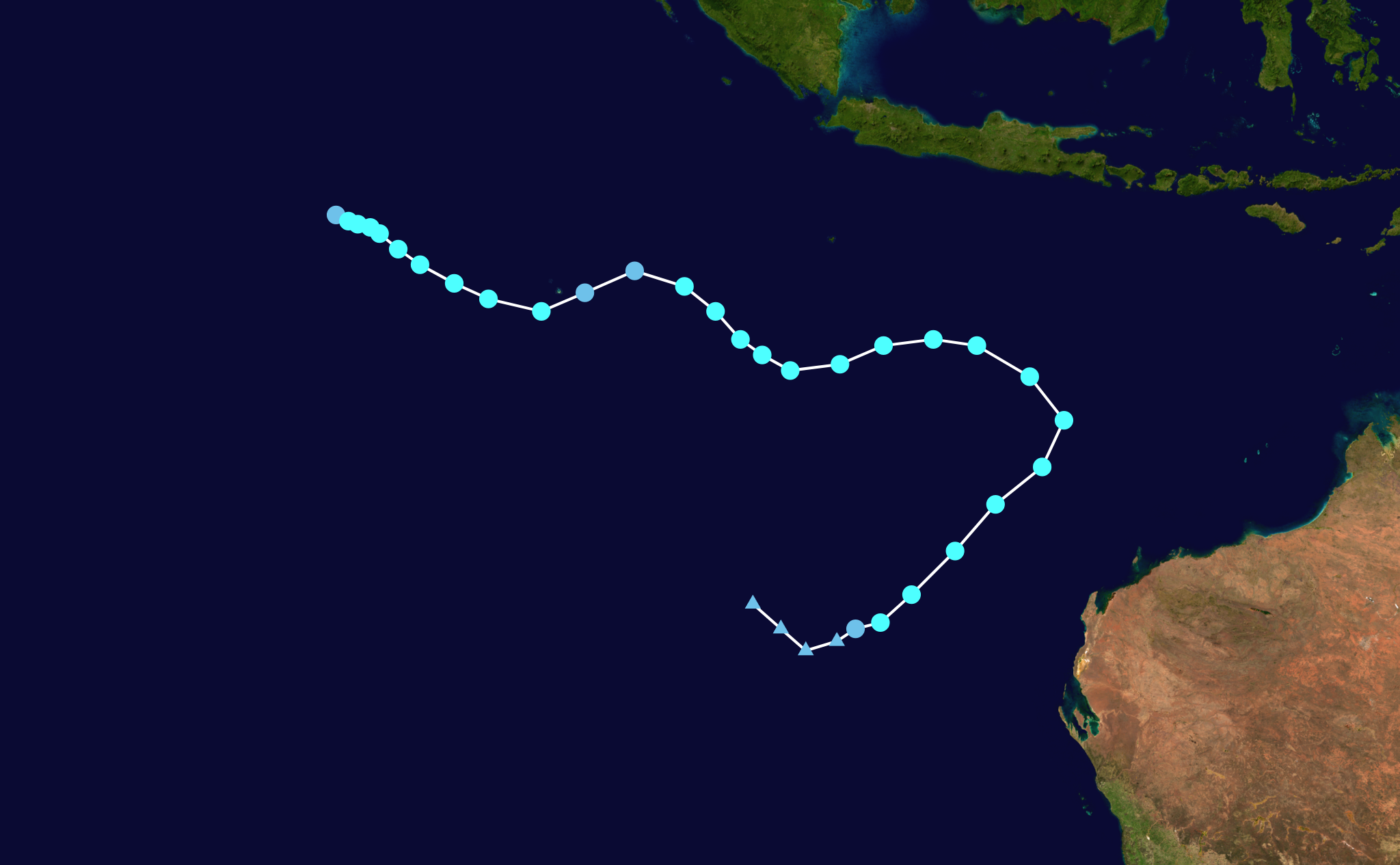
- Duration: 21 January – 29 January
- Peak intensity: 110 km/h (70 mph) (10-min); 980 hPa (mbar)

Clara began as a tropical depression located about 1000 km west-northwest of Cocos Island. Clara moved southwest before being named late on 21 January. However, Clara was located close to Cyclone Brian and rapidly weaken due to shear from Brian. Clara regained tropical cyclone status on 24 January with peak intensity occurring 2 days later on 26 January. Strong winds traveling northwest in the troposphere ripped Clara up, causing her to dissipate on 29 January.

=== Severe Tropical Cyclone Dean ===
- Category 5 severe tropical cyclone (Australian scale)
- Category 2 tropical cyclone (SSHWS)
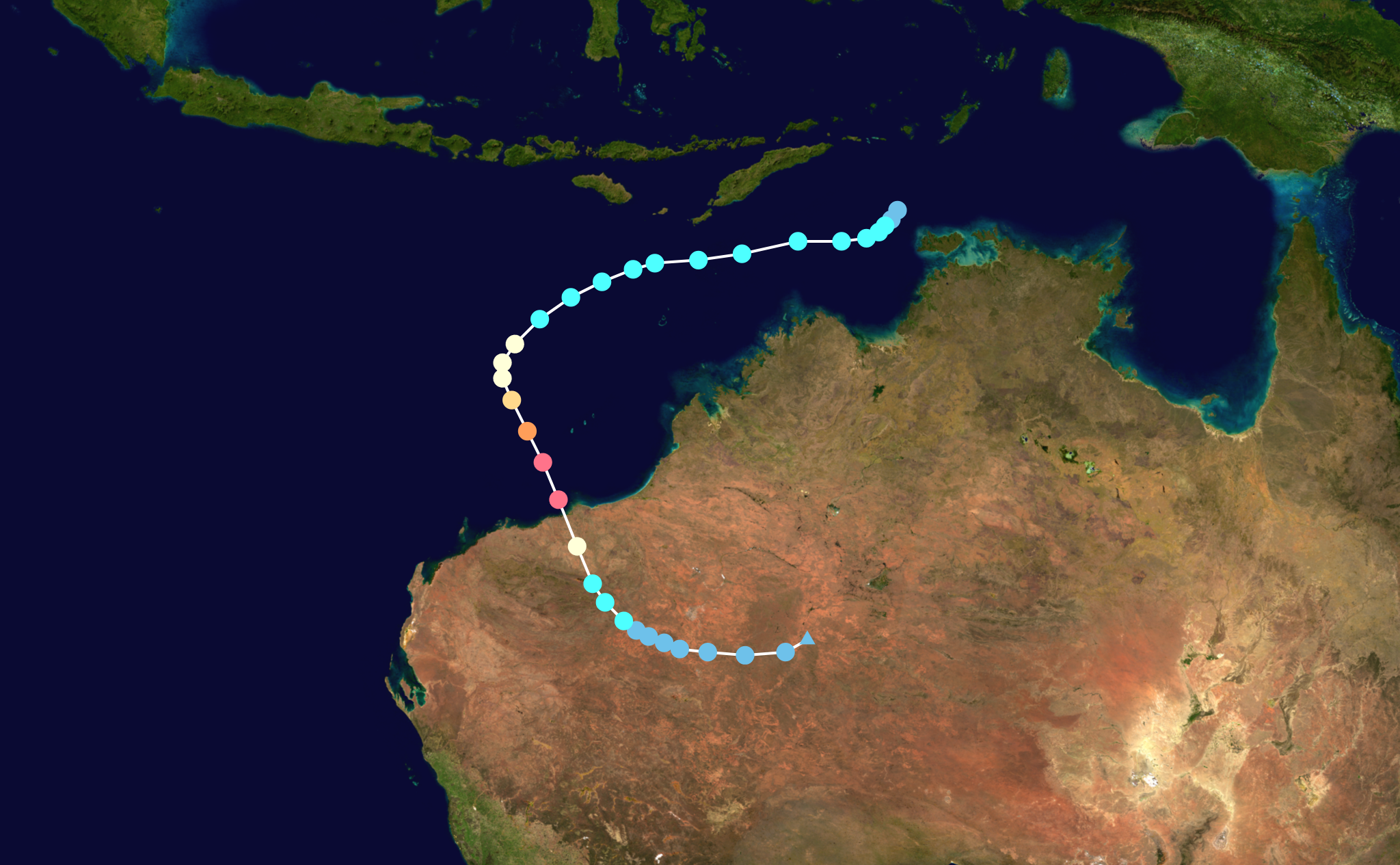
- Duration: 28 January – 3 February
- Peak intensity: 205 km/h (125 mph) (10-min); 930 hPa (mbar)

Dean was the third tropical cyclone to develop between 19 and 28 January in a persistent monsoonal low pressure trough, extending from northern Australia westward across the Indian Ocean. Late on 26 January, a pre-cyclone cloud cluster and an associated surface low formed near Bathurst Island and slowly moved westward. The system intensified rapidly, and by 28 January, the storm was estimated to have reached tropical cyclone intensity. During the next 36 hours, intensification was slow as Dean moved to the west-southwest at about 20 km/h (12 mph). Late on 30 January, the speed of movement slowed down as the system turned to the south. Dean continued to intensify as it accelerated towards the coast. It reached peak intensity on 31 January, with winds of 200 km/h (120 mph), with the lowest atmospheric pressure recorded at 930 hPa (27 inHg). Early on 1 February, Dean made landfall 48 km (30 mi) east of Port Hedland. It weakened slowly over land, eventually dissipating 2 days later.

In Port Hedland, Western Australia, a wind speed of 130 km/h (81 mph) was recorded, with extensive damage also being reported. Goldsworthy, Marble Bar, and Mt. Newman all reported wind damage, but not as severe as Port Hedland. Flooding between Port Hedland and Mt. Newman caused damage to roads and the railway line. Overall, total damage and industrial losses were estimated at $20 million.

=== Tropical Cyclone Ruth ===
- Category 2 tropical cyclone (Australian scale)
- Category 1 tropical cyclone (SSHWS)
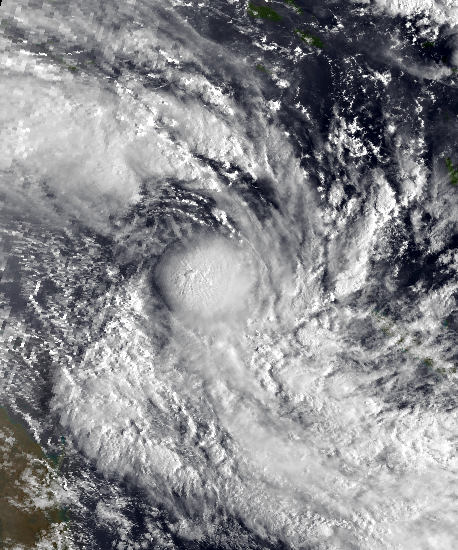
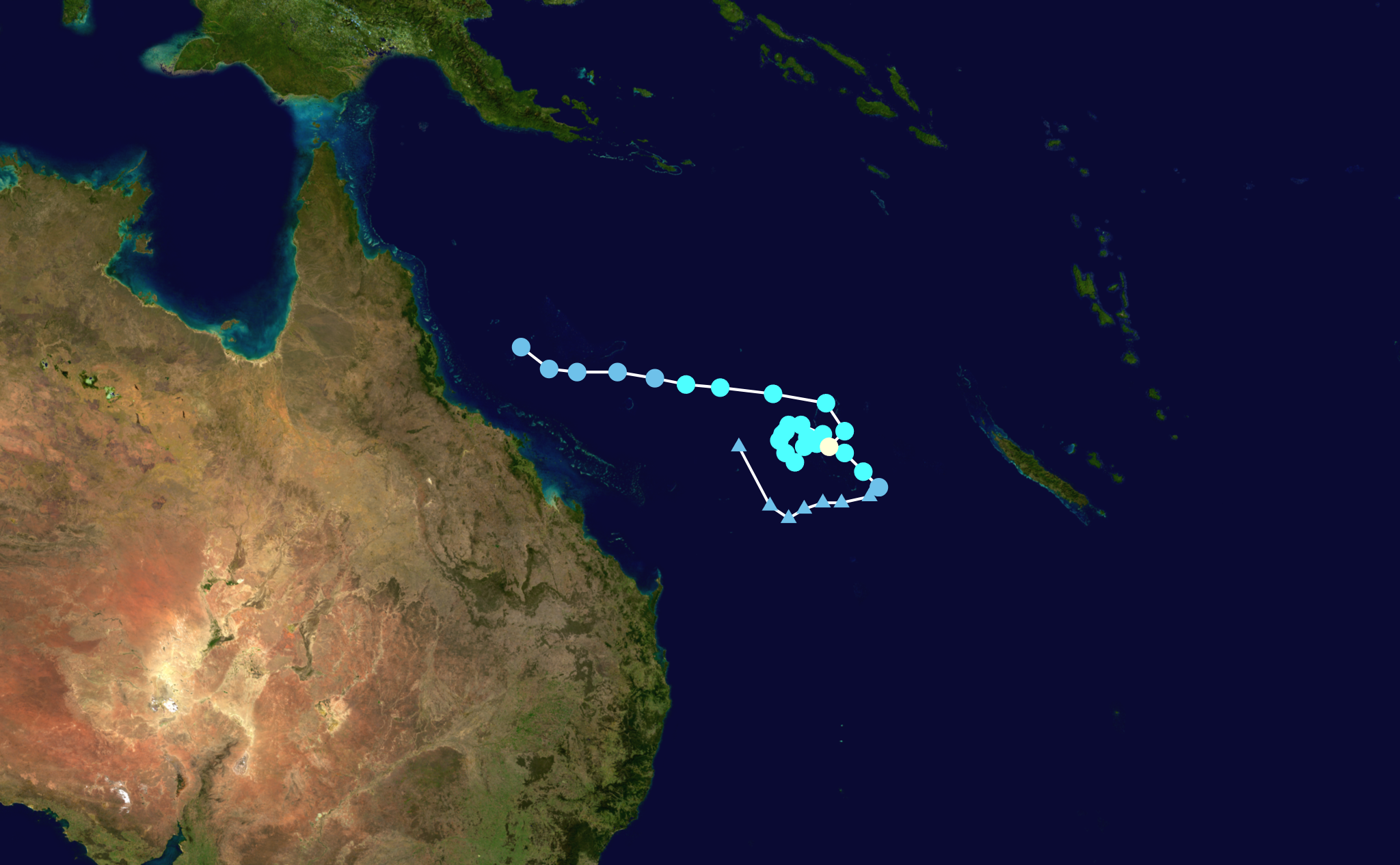
- Duration: 11 February – 18 February
- Peak intensity: 100 km/h (65 mph) (10-min); 980 hPa (mbar)

=== Severe Tropical Cyclone Enid ===
- Category 5 severe tropical cyclone (Australian scale)
- Category 4 tropical cyclone (SSHWS)
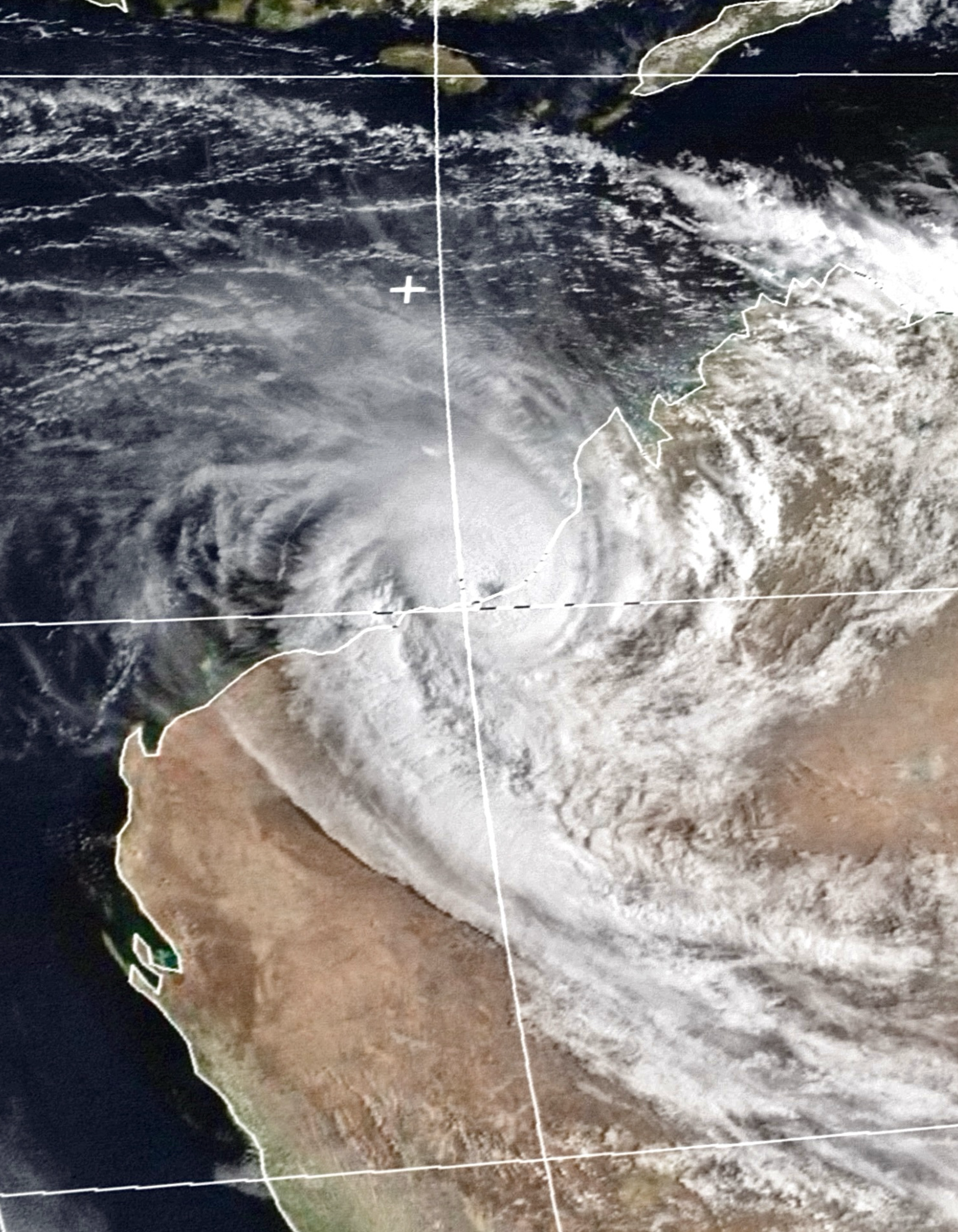
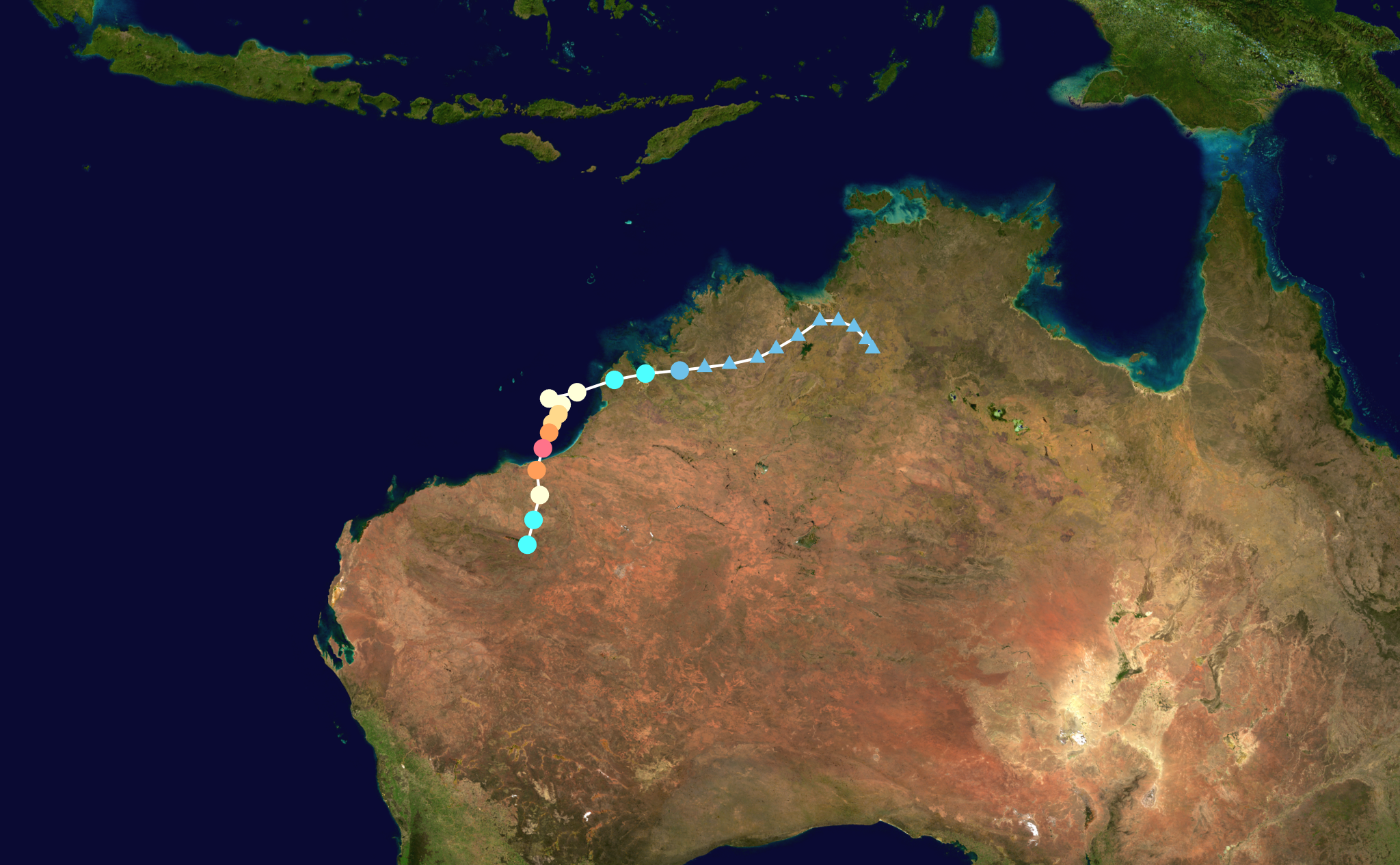
- Duration: 12 February – 18 February
- Peak intensity: 205 km/h (125 mph) (10-min); 930 hPa (mbar)

Enid developed near a weak surface low found near Victoria River Downs, Northern Territory on 12 February. The low deepened as it moved westward, and by 15 February, it had a central pressure of 990 hPa (29 inHg). Enid intensified rapidly over the warm waters. It made landfall on 17 February 25 km (16 mi) west of Wallal, Western Australia, with its central pressure estimated to 930 hPa (27 inHg).

Significant damage to windmills and buildings occurred at Wallal. Cattle worth over $200,000 drowned in the ocean. At Shay Gap, Western Australia, severe damage to blocks of flats and houses, which were unroofed, was observed. No deaths were reported, but minor injuries were sustained. 115 mm (4.5 in) of rain was reported at Bonney Downs, Western Australia, 113 mm (4.4 in) at Marble Bar, Western Australia, and 99 mm (3.9 in) at Newman, Western Australia. Wind gusts up to 200 km/h (124 mph) are estimated to have occurred near Wallal.

=== Severe Tropical Cyclone Fred ===
- Category 4 severe tropical cyclone (Australian scale)
- Category 4 tropical cyclone (SSHWS)
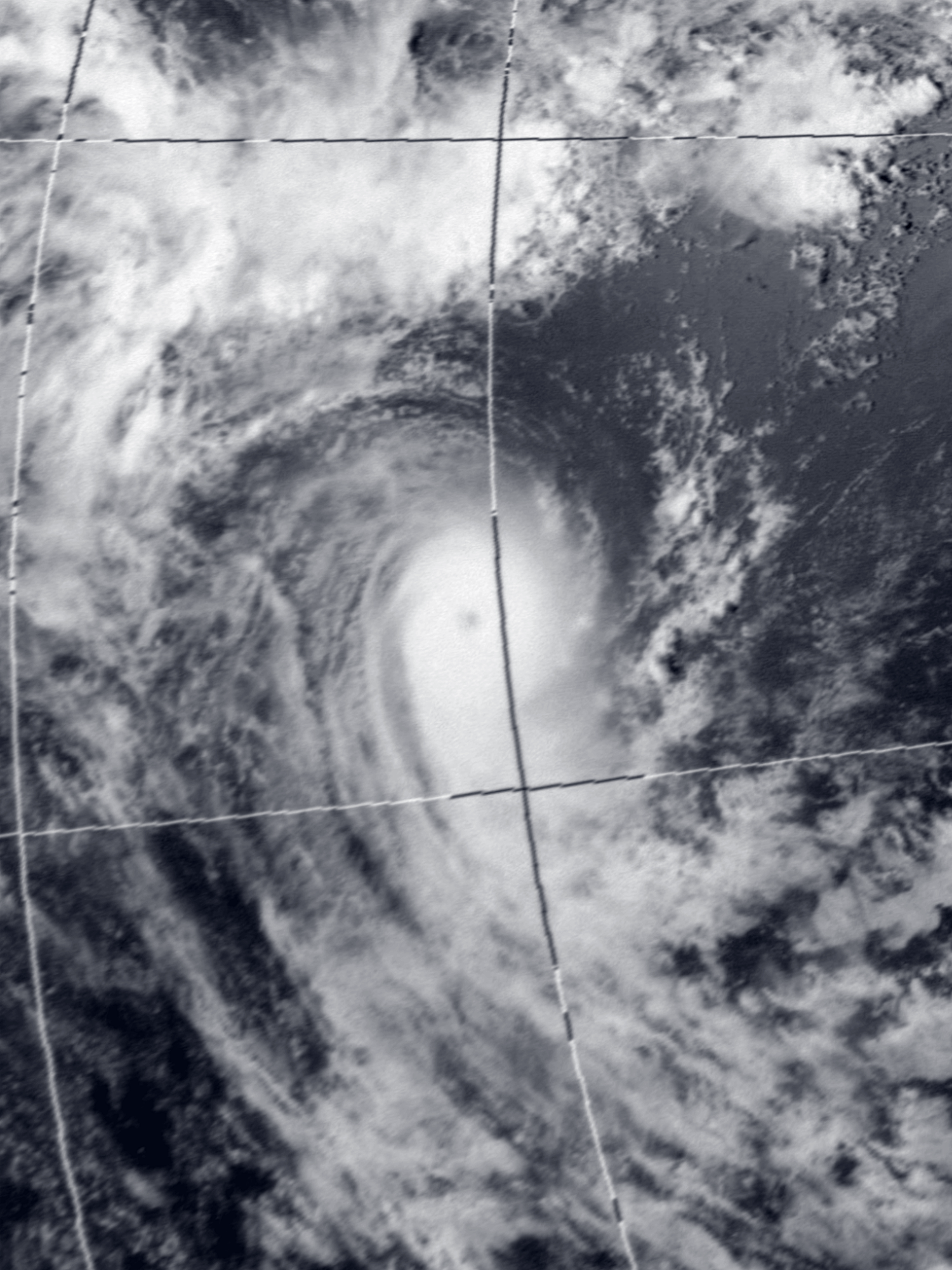
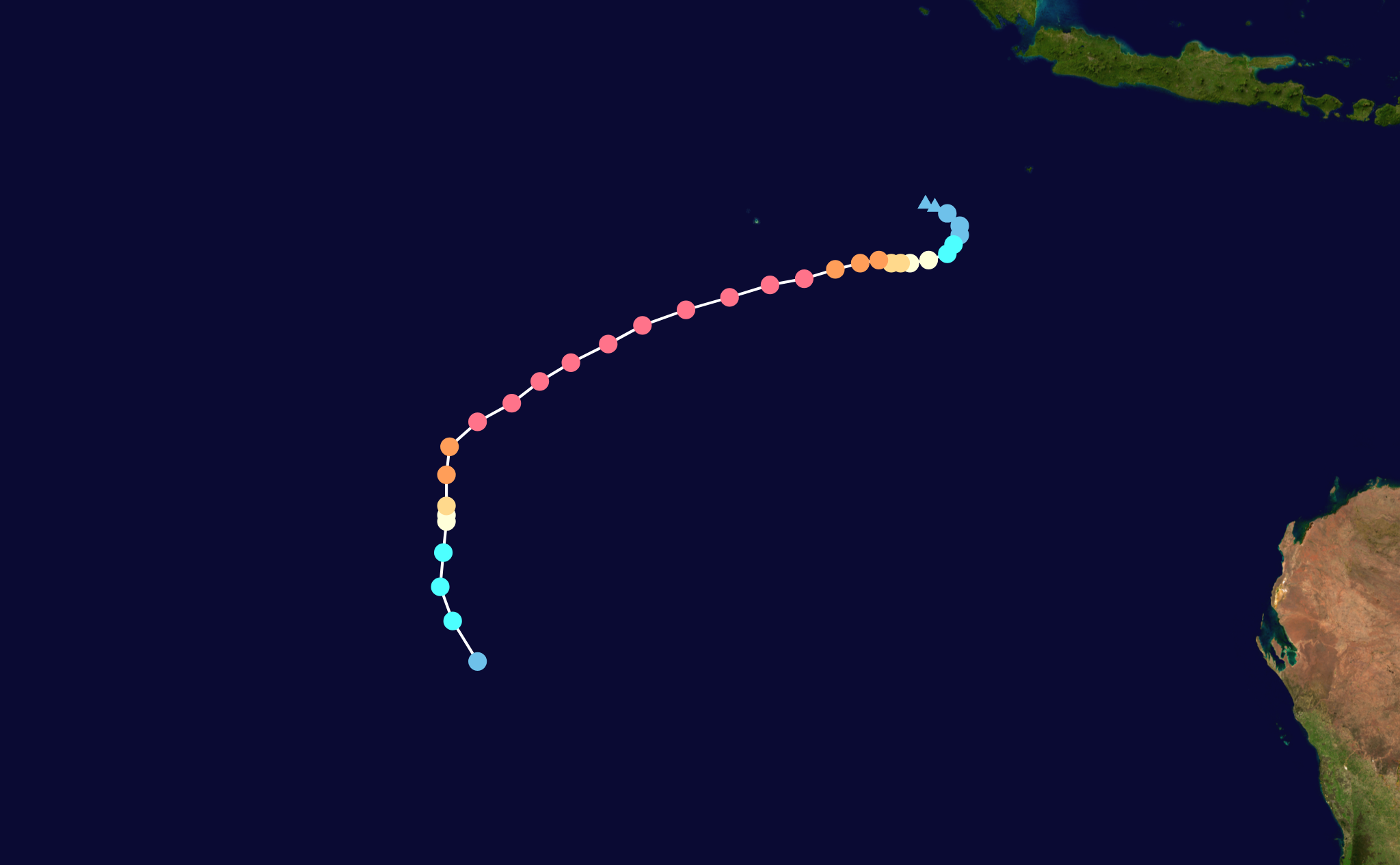
- Duration: 20 February – 28 February
- Peak intensity: 195 km/h (120 mph) (10-min); 930 hPa (mbar)

On 19 February, TCWC Perth reported that a tropical depression had developed out of an active area of convection that was associated with a monsoonal shear line about midway between the Cocos and Christmas Islands.

Fred developed from an active area of convection associated with the monsoon shear line about midway between Cocos and Christmas Islands late on 19 February 1980. It reached tropical cyclone strength early on 21 February 1980 and attained its maximum intensity on the afternoon of 24 February 1980 when the central pressure was estimated to be near 930 hPa. Despite the small size of the cyclone it maintained this intensity with minor fluctuations until about 1200 UTC 25 February 1980. Early on 26 February the direction of movement changed from southwestward to southward as Fred came under the influence of a northwesterly upper-level flow. It weakened rapidly as it moved into a strong ridge of high pressure located at about latitude 33°S.

=== Severe Tropical Cyclone Simon ===
- Category 4 severe tropical cyclone (Australian scale)
- Category 3 tropical cyclone (SSHWS)
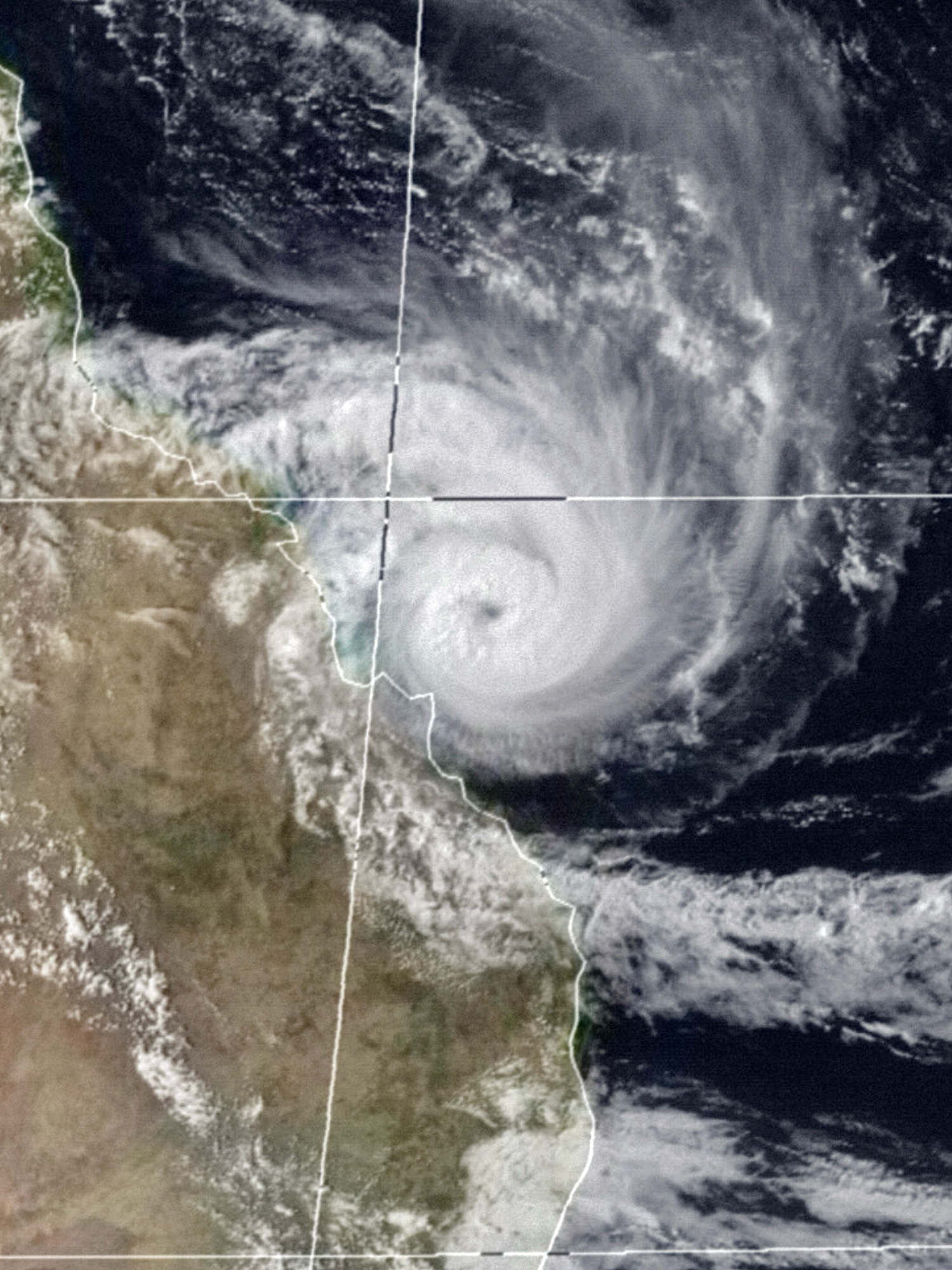
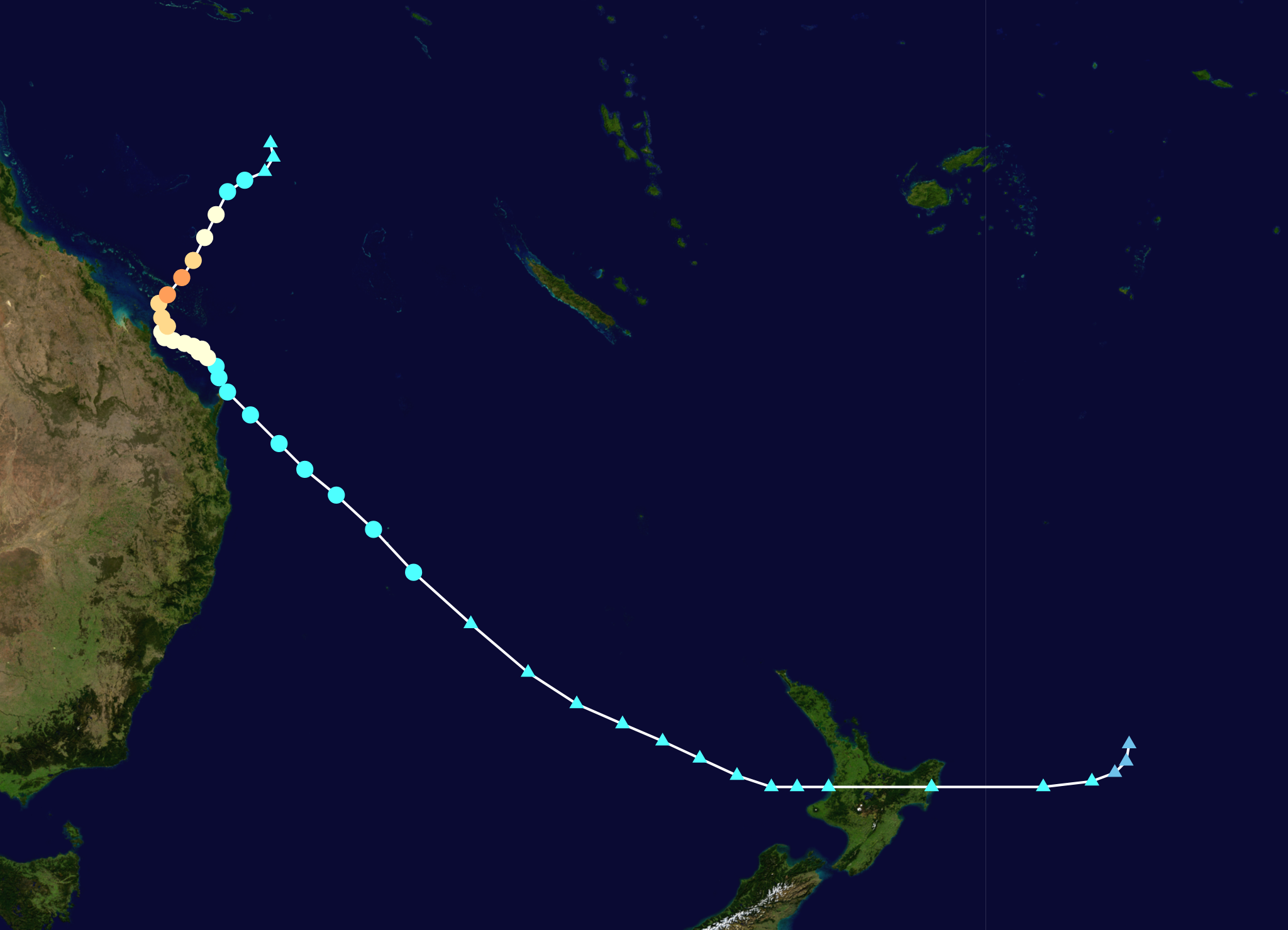
- Duration: 21 February – 28 February (Crossed 160°E)
- Peak intensity: 165 km/h (105 mph) (10-min); 950 hPa (mbar)

=== Tropical Cyclone Sina ===
- Category 1 tropical cyclone (Australian scale)
- Tropical storm (SSHWS)
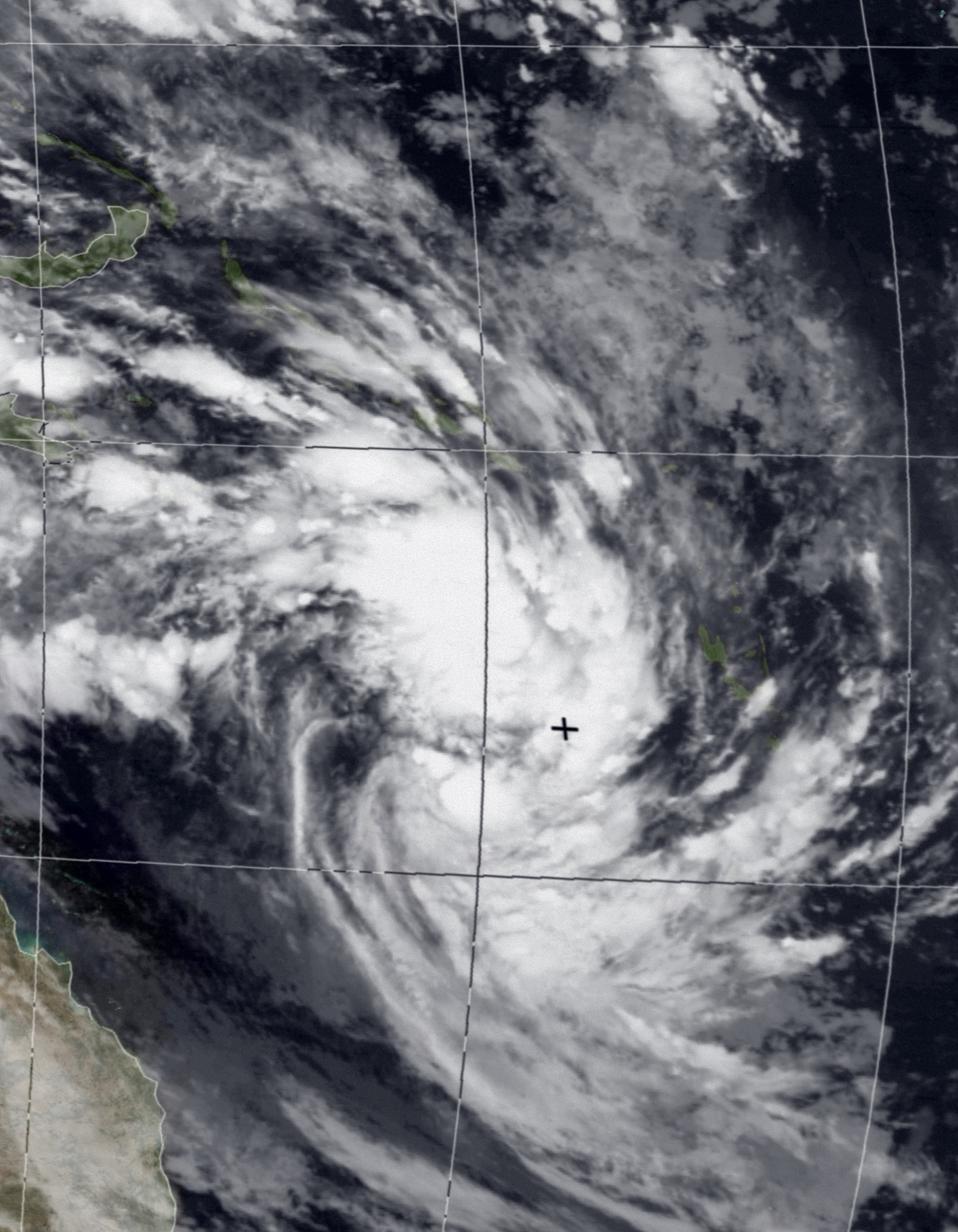
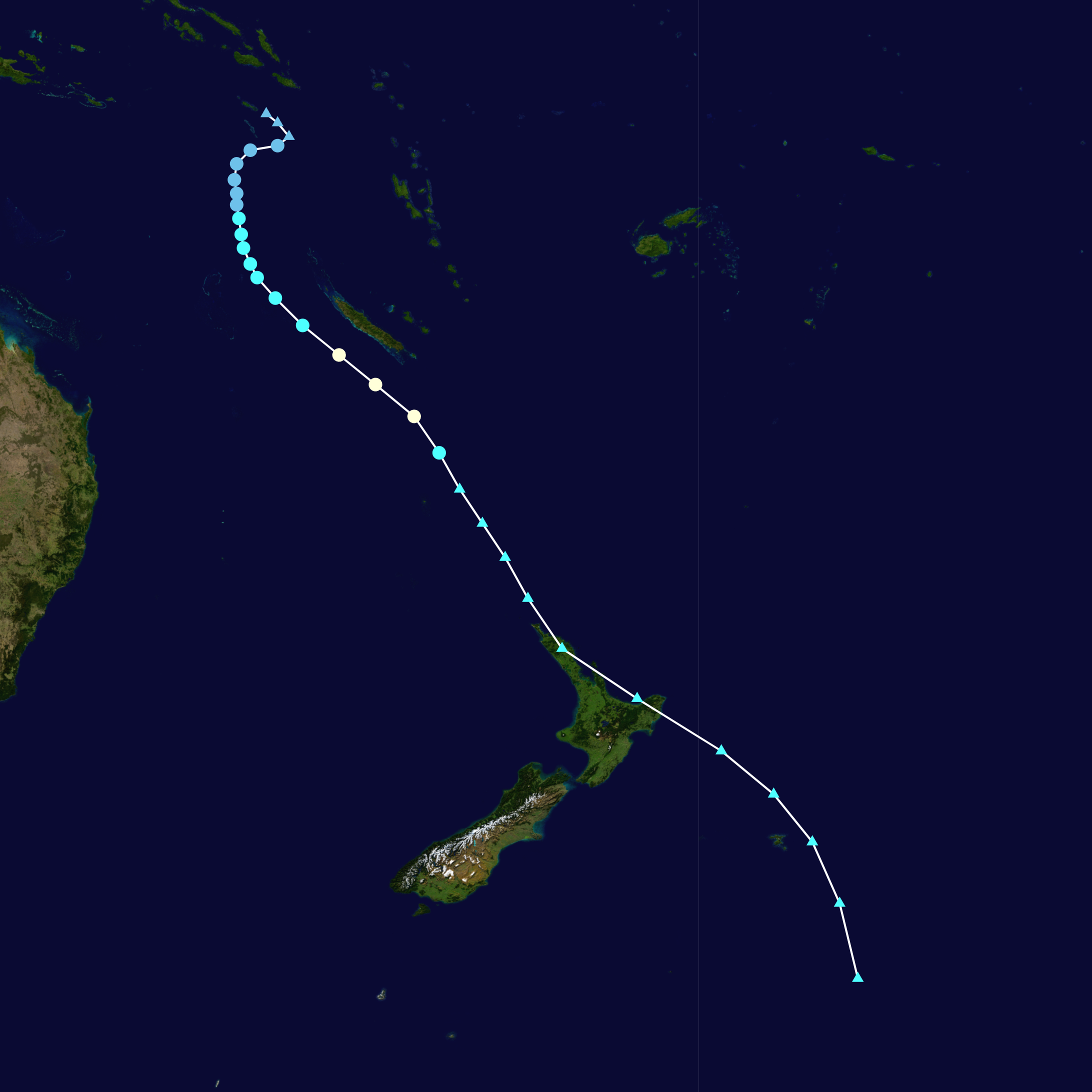
- Duration: 10 March – 11 March (Crossed 160°E)
- Peak intensity: 65 km/h (40 mph) (10-min); 995 hPa (mbar)

During 9 March the precursor tropical low to Severe Tropical Cyclone Sina, moved south-westwards into the region of the South Pacific. The system subsequently developed into a tropical cyclone and was named Sina by the BoM, before it moved south-eastwards out of the region early the next day.

=== Severe Tropical Cyclone Doris–Gloria ===
- Category 4 severe tropical cyclone (Australian scale)
- Category 3 tropical cyclone (SSHWS)
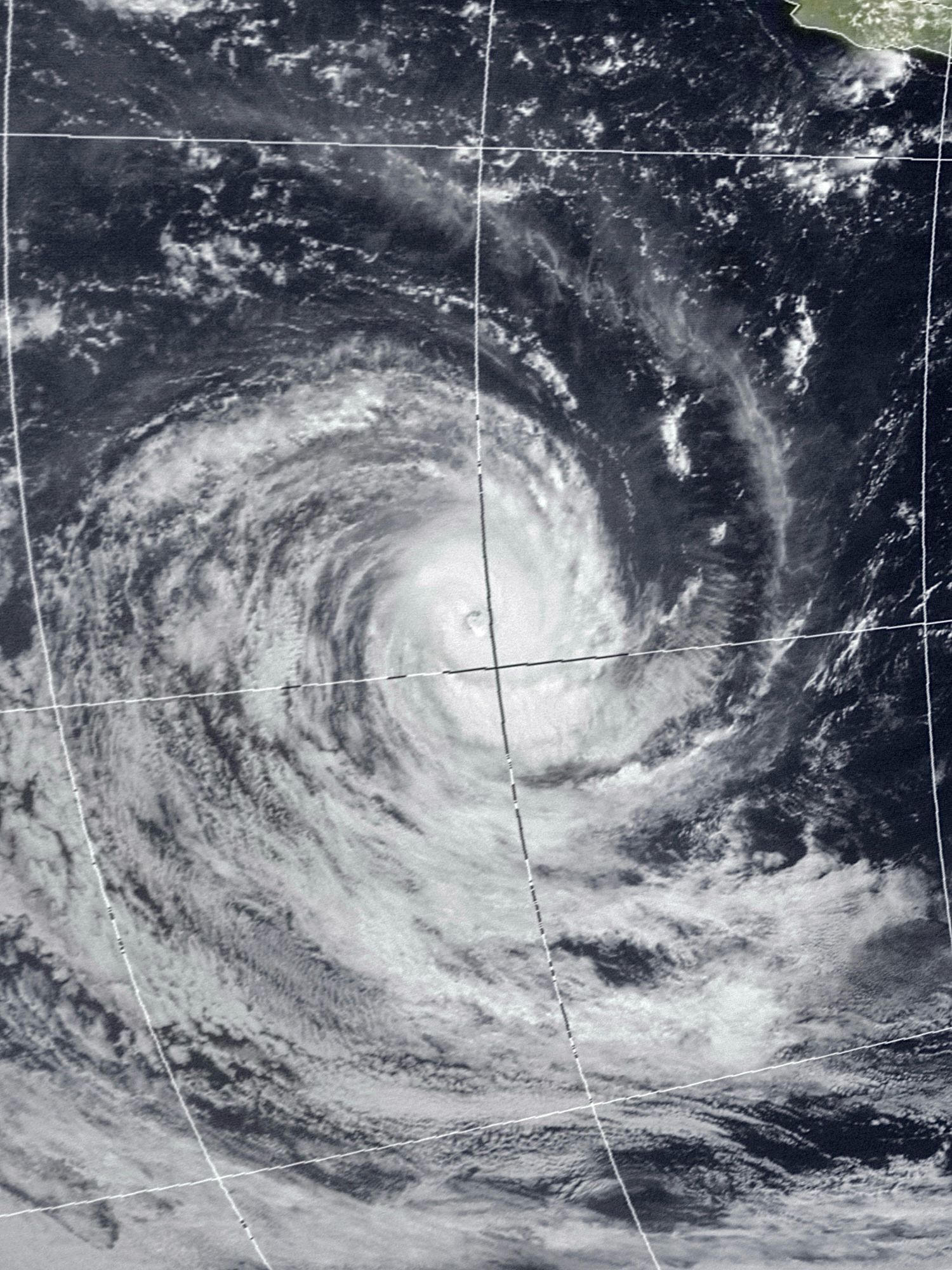
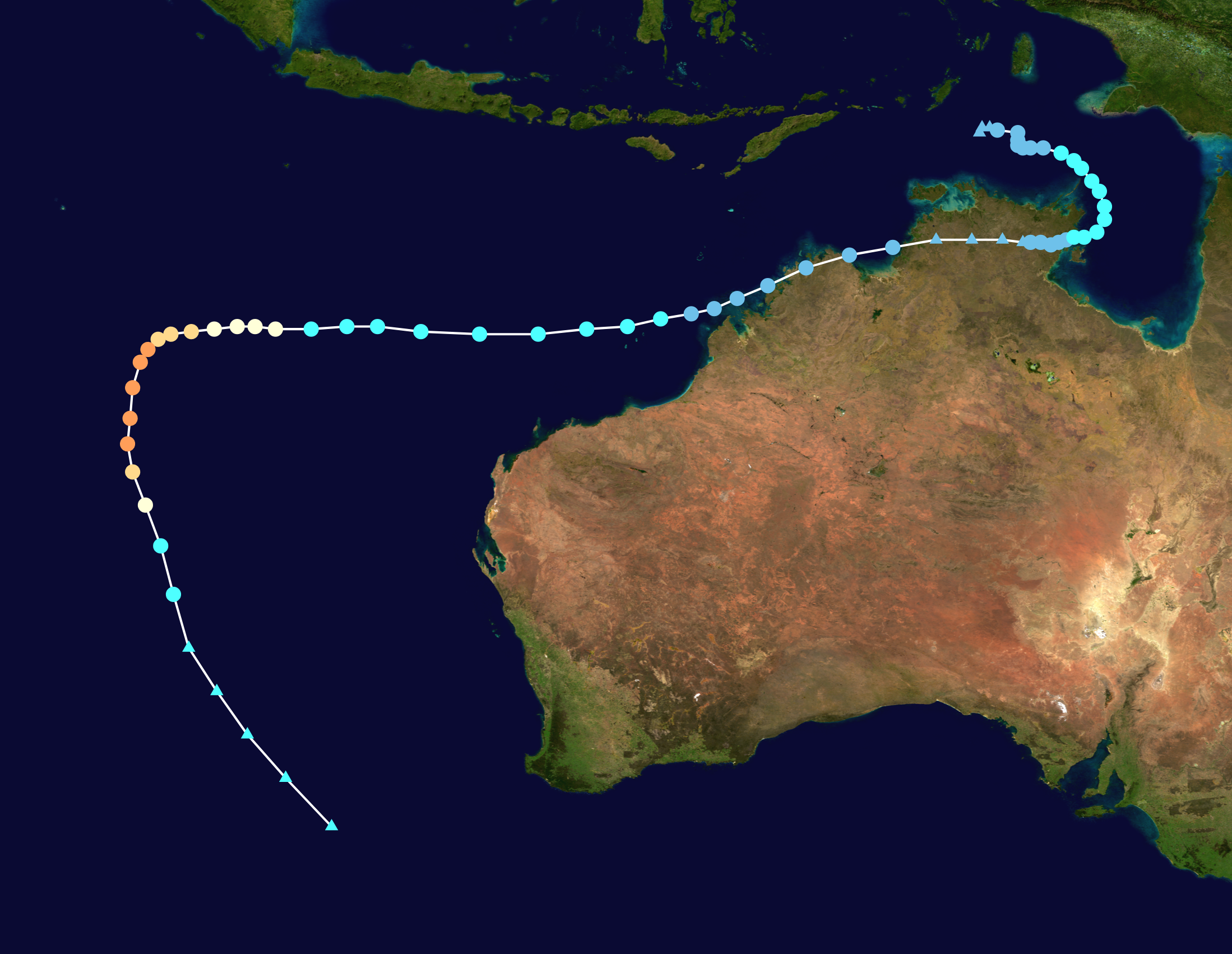
- Duration: 14 March – 29 March
- Peak intensity: 165 km/h (105 mph) (10-min); 955 hPa (mbar)

=== Unnamed tropical cyclone ===
- Category 1 tropical cyclone (Australian scale)
- Tropical storm (SSHWS)
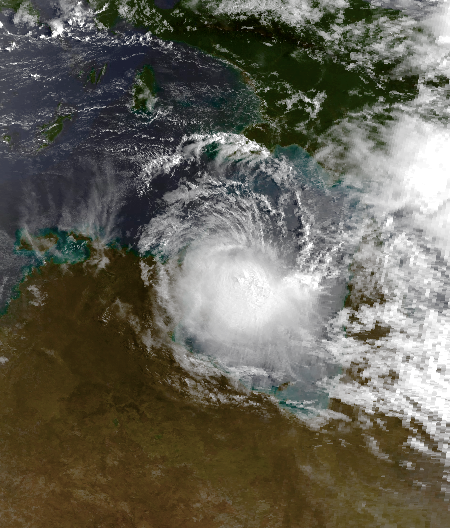
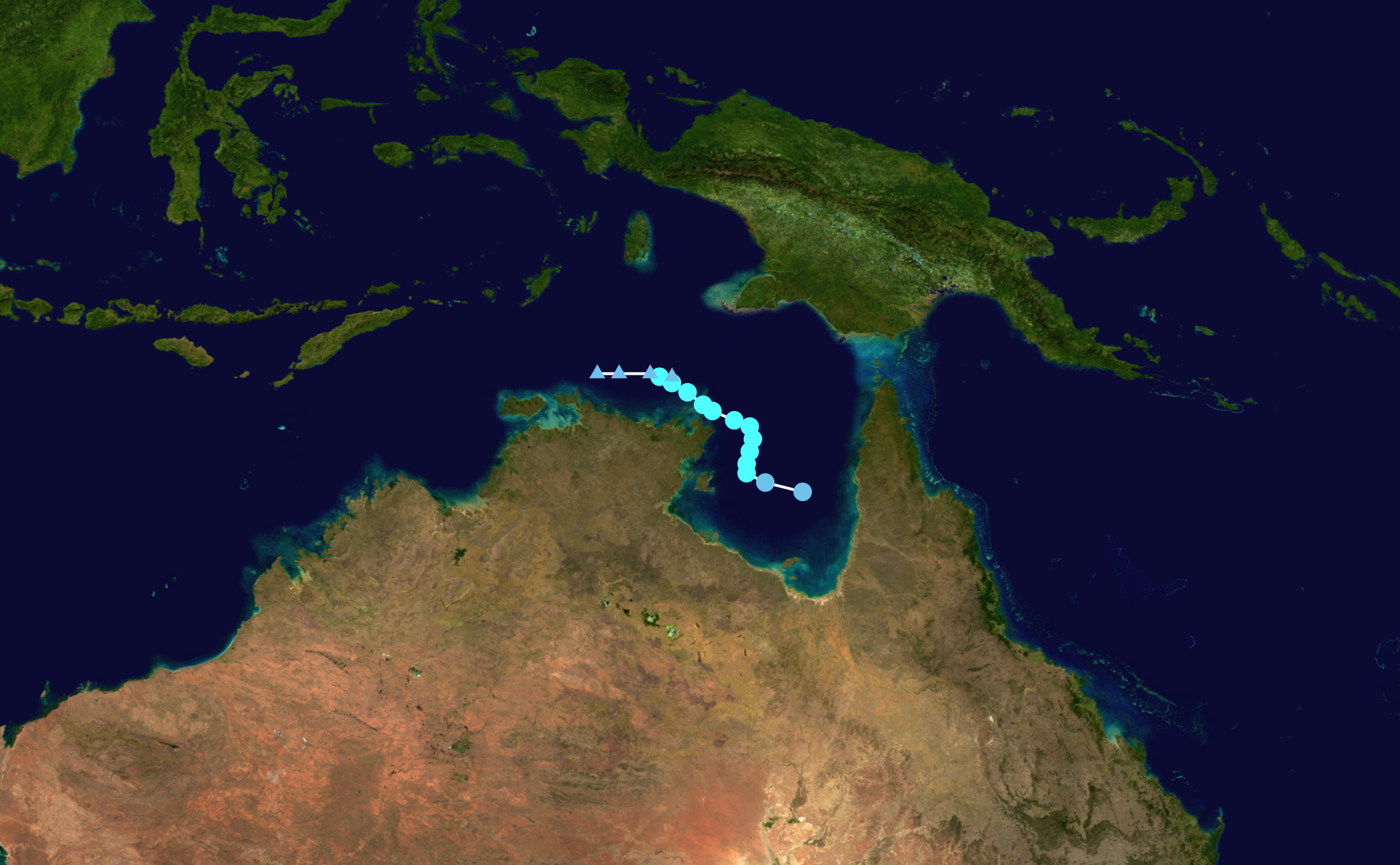
- Duration: 27 March – 30 March
- Peak intensity: 75 km/h (45 mph) (10-min); 998 hPa (mbar)

On 27 March, TCWC Darwin reported that a tropical depression had developed in the Gulf of Carpentaria about 300 km (190 mi) to the southwest of Wallaby island. During that day the system intensified enough to produce localized and intermittent gale-force winds, over the northeast Arnhem land as it moved into the Arafura sea. Early on 28 March, TCWC Darwin reported that despite the depression having reached cyclone intensity of 65 km/h (40 mph), it was not a tropical cyclone as the system had not developed a "deep convective warm cored structure". However, during post storm analysis TCWC Darwin reported that the depression had become a tropical cyclone at 0000 UTC (0800 WST) on 28 March. During 28 March, the system moved towards the north, before during the next day as the cyclone turned towards the west and moved into the Arafura sea it reached its lowest central pressure of 998 hPa (29.47 inHg). As the system moved further into the Arafura sea, a very strong amount of vertical windshear and an intrusion of dry air made the cyclone rapidly weaken into a tropical depression before the residual depression dissipated on 31 March just to the north of the Cobourg peninsular. The Cyclone caused no deaths and only minor damage was reported to have occurred.

== Seasonal effects ==
Name	Dates	Peak intensity			Areas affected	Damages (AU$)	Damages (US$)	Deaths
Name	Dates	Category	Wind speed (km/h (mph))	Pressure (hPa)	Areas affected	Damages (AU$)	Damages (US$)	Deaths
Tony	26–31 August	Category 2 tropical cyclone	95 km/h (60 mph)	990 hPa (29.23 inHg)	None	None	None	None
Simon	21–28 February 1980	Category 4 severe tropical cyclone	165 km/h (105 mph)	950 hPa (28.05 inHg)	Queensland, New Zealand	Minor	Minor	None

== See also ==
- Atlantic hurricane seasons: 1979, 1980
- Eastern Pacific hurricane seasons: 1979, 1980
- Western Pacific typhoon seasons: 1979, 1980
- North Indian Ocean cyclone seasons: 1979, 1980
