= 1995 Pacific typhoon season =

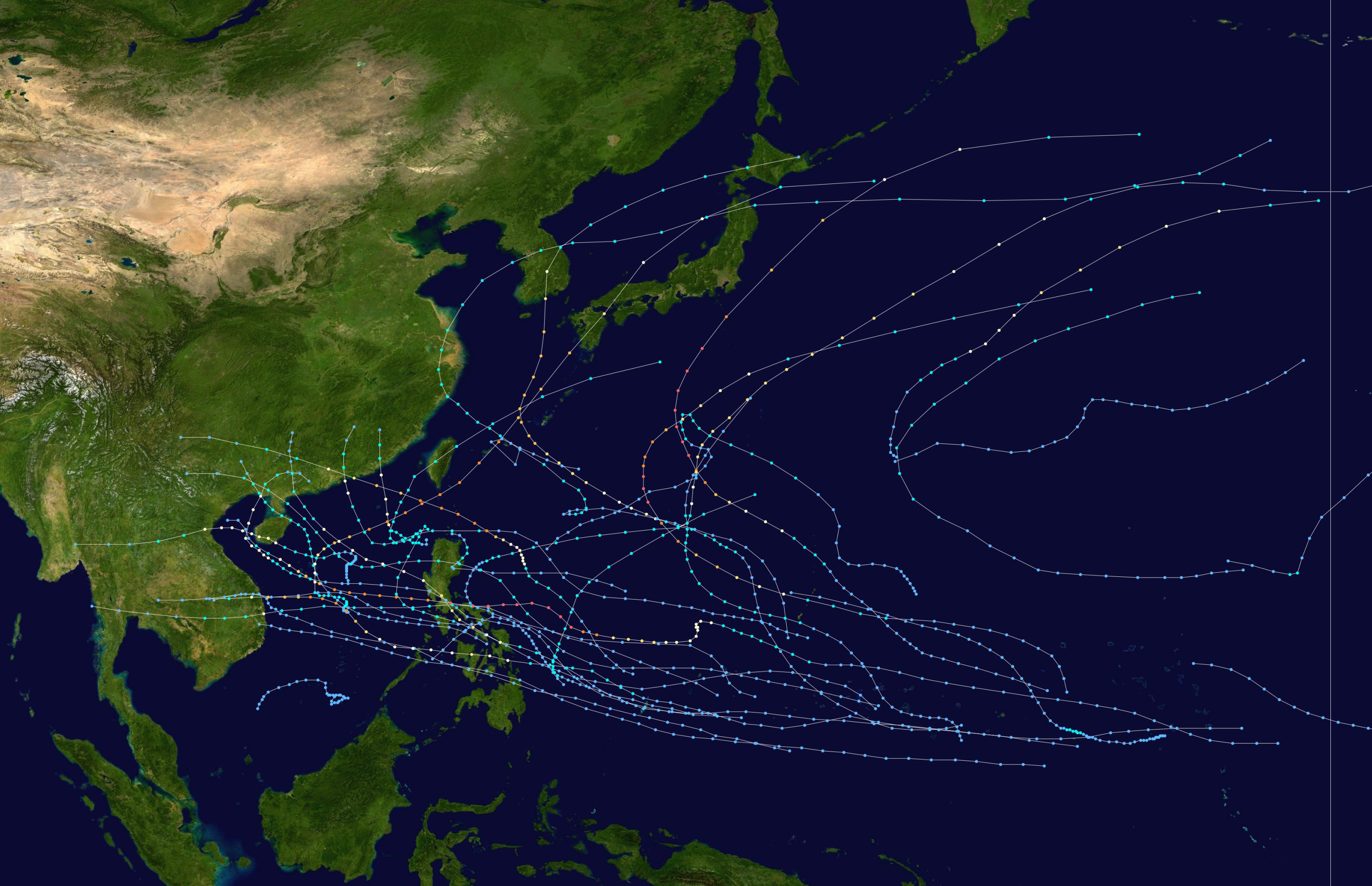
- Season summary map

Seasonal boundaries
- First system formed: January 7, 1995
- Last system dissipated: December 31, 1995

Strongest storm
- Name: Angela
  - Maximum winds: 215 km/h (130 mph) (10-minute sustained)
  - Lowest pressure: 910 hPa (mbar)

Seasonal statistics
- Total depressions: 47
- Total storms: 24
- Typhoons: 8
- Very strong typhoons: 6
- Violent typhoons: 1
- ACE: 255.1 units
- Total fatalities: 1,464 total
- Total damage: $2.57 billion (1995 USD)

Related articles
- 1995 Atlantic hurricane season; 1995 Pacific hurricane season; 1995 North Indian Ocean cyclone season

The 1995 Pacific typhoon season was a slightly below-average Pacific typhoon season in terms of named storms. In addition, the season saw the formation of forty-seven tropical cyclones, twenty-four of which were named storms, most of which were quite weak and short-lived, ending the seven-year stretch of above average activity. Eight typhoons formed during the season, one of them becoming a super typhoon, the fewest since 1988. The moderate 1995–96 La Niña event was a contributing factor to this low-activity.

This season has no official bounds; it ran year-round in the year, but most tropical cyclones tend to form in the northwestern Pacific Ocean between June and October. These dates conventionally delimit the period of each year when most tropical cyclones form in the northwestern Pacific Ocean. The first named storm, Chuck, developed on April 27 while the last named storm, Dan, dissipated on December 31. Typhoon Angela became the worst tropical cyclone to hit the Philippines, killing over 1,000 people.

The scope of this article is limited to the Pacific Ocean to the north of the equator between 100°E and 180th meridian. Within the northwestern Pacific Ocean, there are two agencies which assign names to tropical cyclones which can often result in a cyclone having two names. The Japan Meteorological Agency (JMA) (Note: The Japan Meteorological Agency is the official Regional Specialized Meteorological Center for the western Pacific Ocean.) will name a tropical cyclone if it has 10-minute sustained wind speeds of at least 65 km/h (40 mph) anywhere in the basin, while the Philippine Atmospheric, Geophysical and Astronomical Services Administration (PAGASA) assigns names to tropical cyclones which are active in the Philippine Area of Responsibility (PAR), located between 135°E and 115°E and between 5°N–25°N, regardless of whether or not a tropical cyclone has already been given a name by the JMA. Tropical depressions that are monitored by the United States' Joint Typhoon Warning Center (JTWC) (Note: The Joint Typhoon Warning Center is a joint United States Navy – United States Air Force task force that issues tropical cyclone warnings for the western Pacific Ocean and other regions.) (Note: A super typhoon is an unofficial category used by the Joint Typhoon Warning Center (JTWC) for a typhoon with winds of at least 240 km/h (150 mph).) are given a number with a "W" suffix.

== Systems ==
=== Tropical Depression 01W ===
- Tropical depression (SSHWS)
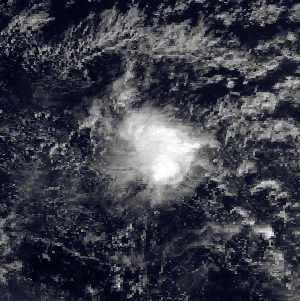
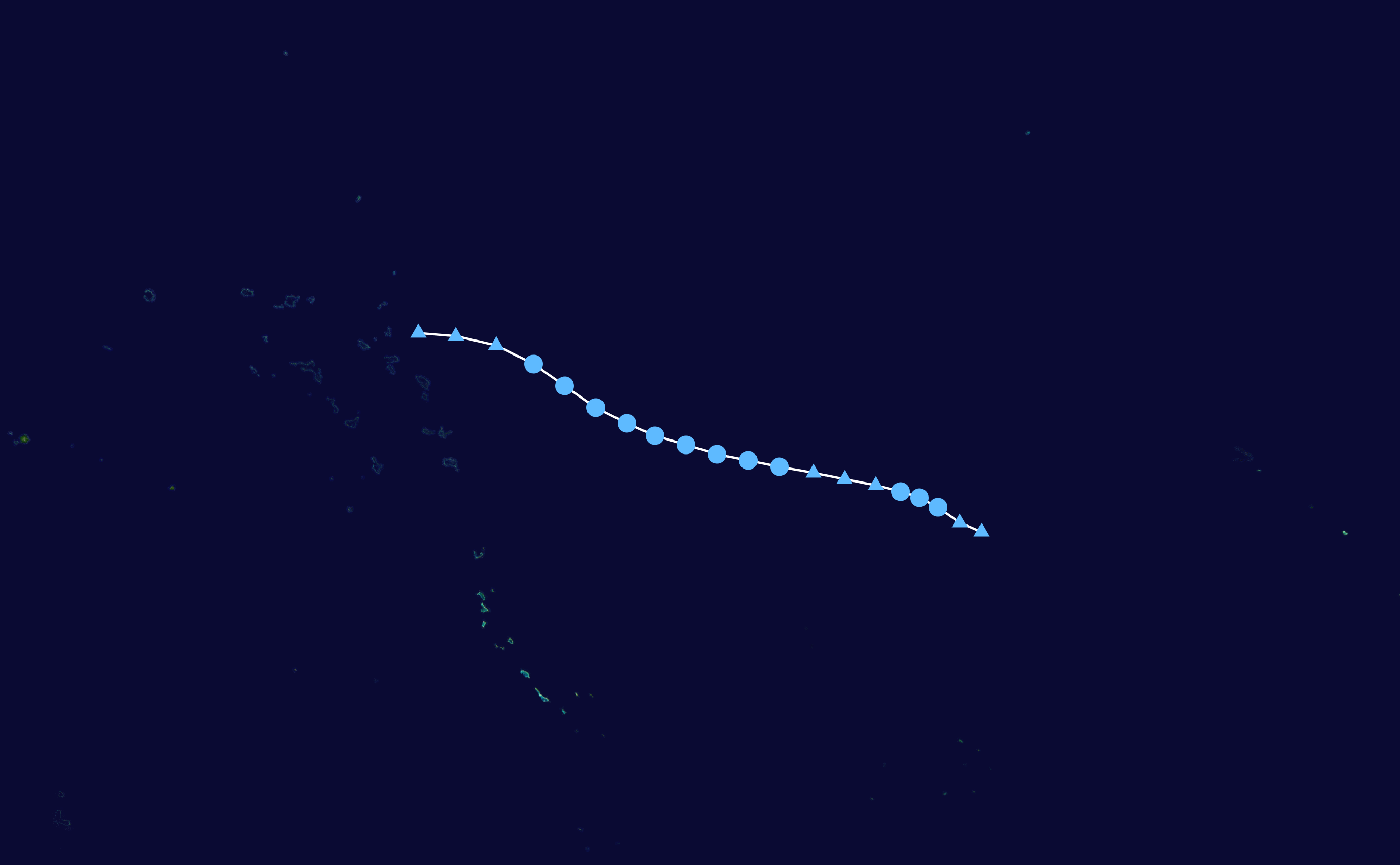
- Duration: January 7 (entered basin) – January 8
- Peak intensity: 55 km/h (35 mph) (1-min); 1000 hPa (mbar)

A circulation started to develop and spawned a tropical disturbance near the equator but east of the International Dateline on December 30, 1994. The system remained stationary for several days until it finally gathered some warm waters and low to moderate windshear on January 5. With that, the JTWC classified it as Tropical Depression 01W as it crossed the basin early on January 7. Moving northeastwards, it entered an area of high vertical windshear, cool waters and weak convection and dissipated on January 9.

=== Tropical Storm Chuck ===
- Tropical storm (JMA)
- Tropical storm (SSHWS)
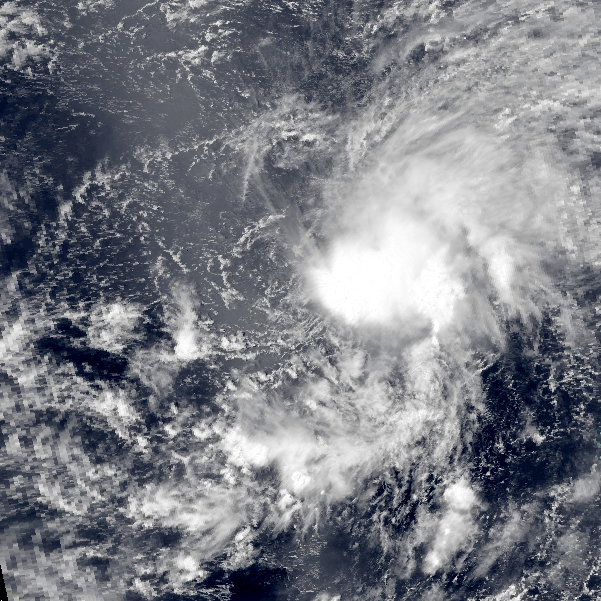
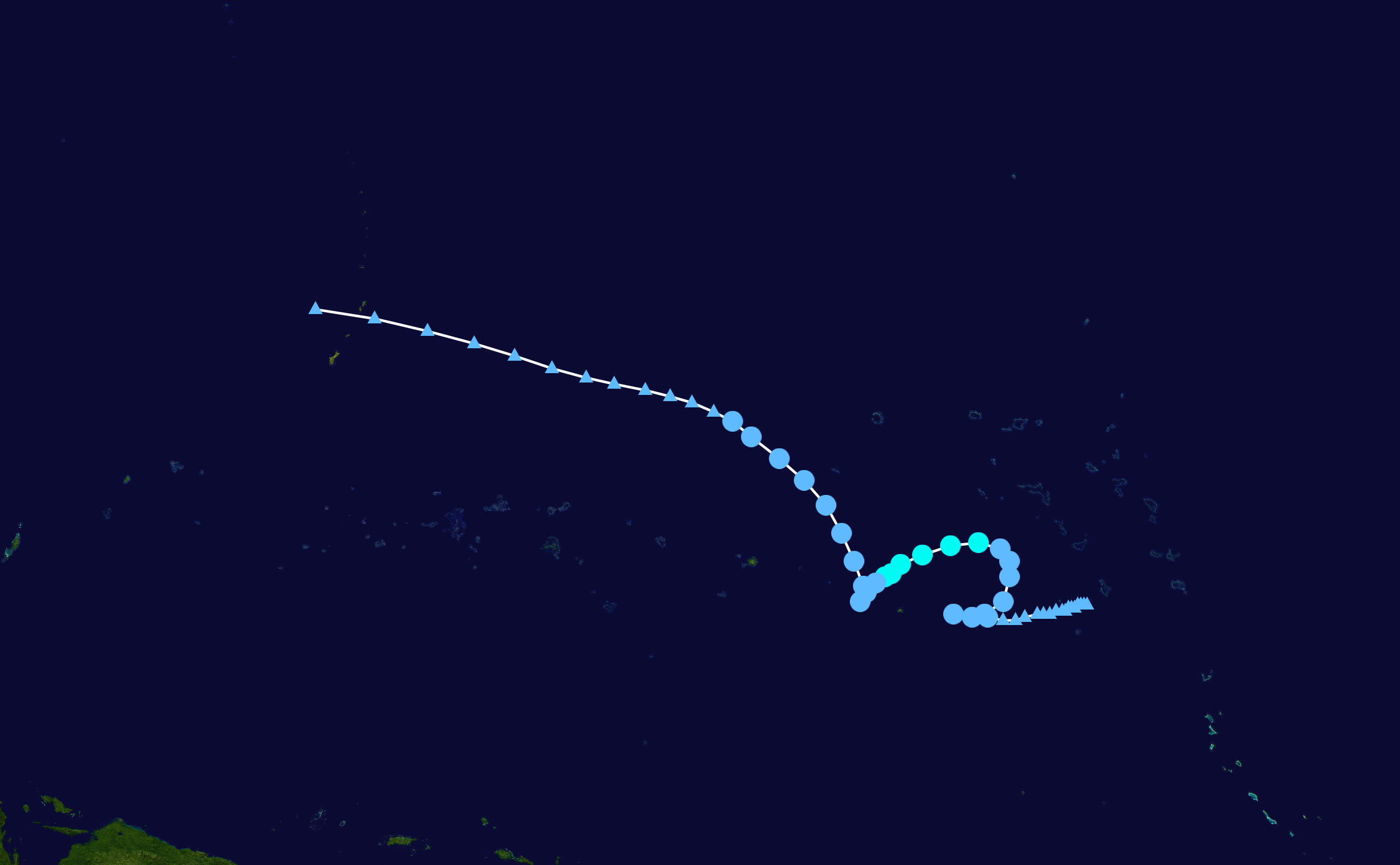
- Duration: April 27 – May 4
- Peak intensity: 65 km/h (40 mph) (10-min); 998 hPa (mbar)

Chuck stayed in the ocean.

=== Tropical Storm Deanna (Auring) ===
- Tropical storm (JMA)
- Tropical storm (SSHWS)
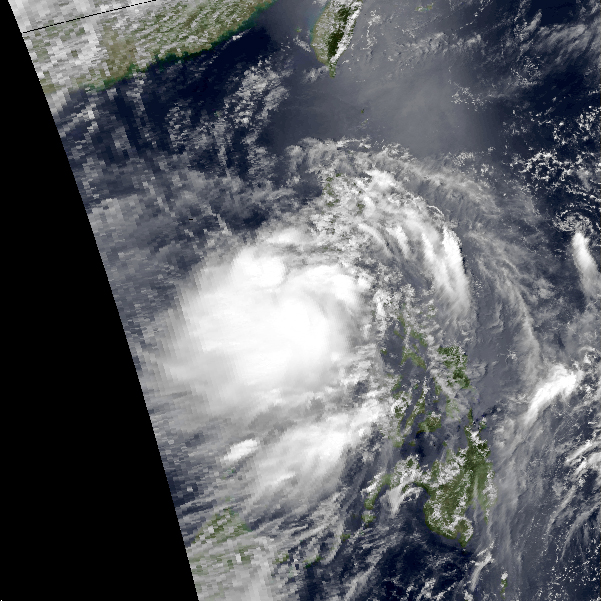
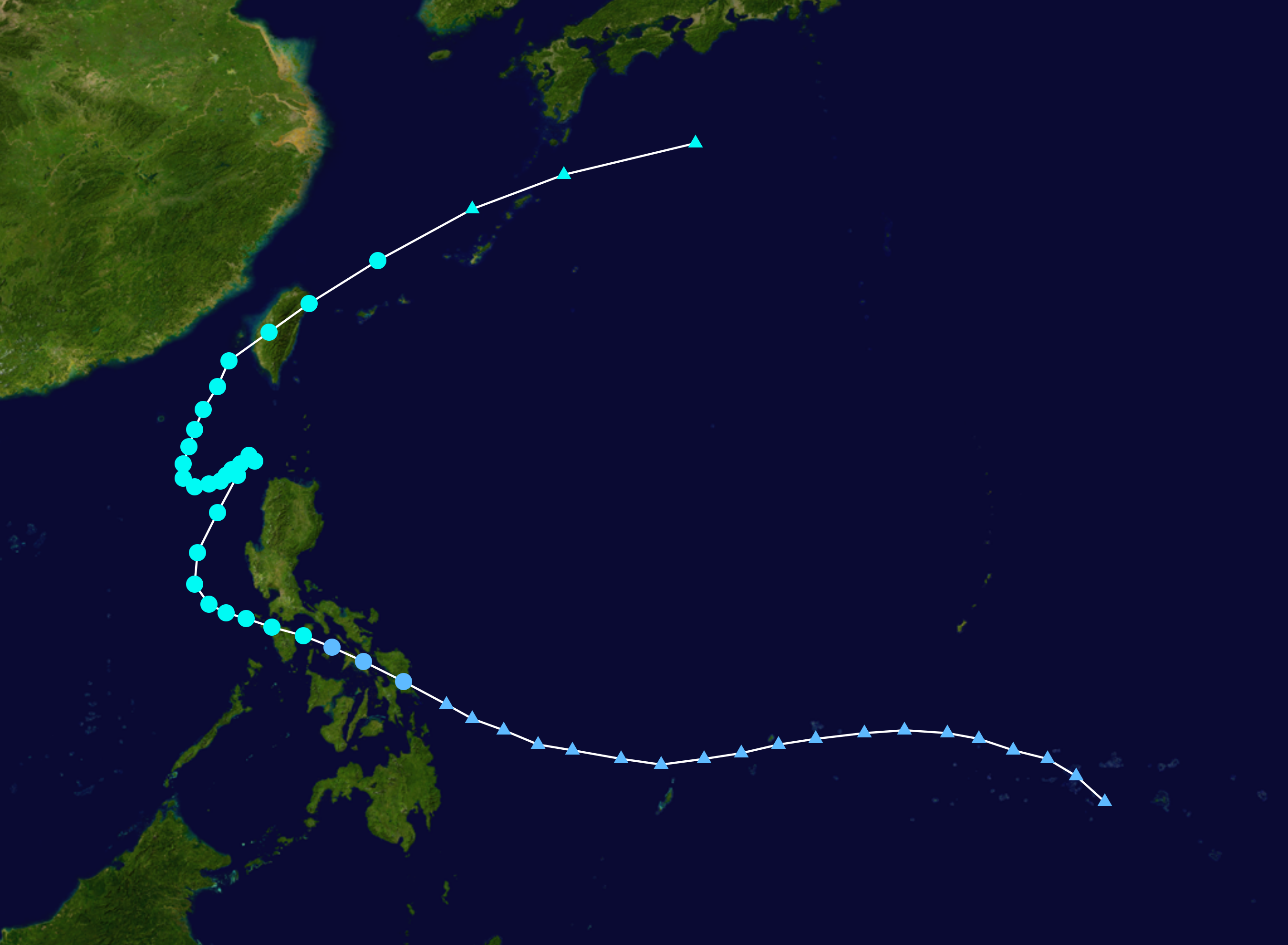
- Duration: May 28 – June 10
- Peak intensity: 75 km/h (45 mph) (10-min); 996 hPa (mbar)

At May 28, a low pressure area formed in the Pacific Ocean. A few days later, it moved towards the Philippines. Deanna then did a loop in the northeastern South China Sea after it passed through Phllippines. At June 8, Deanna moved towards Taiwan in an unusual west coast. It then brought heavy rain. Agricultural losses reached NT$410 million (US$15.5 million).

=== Tropical Depression Eli ===
- Tropical depression (JMA)
- Tropical storm (SSHWS)
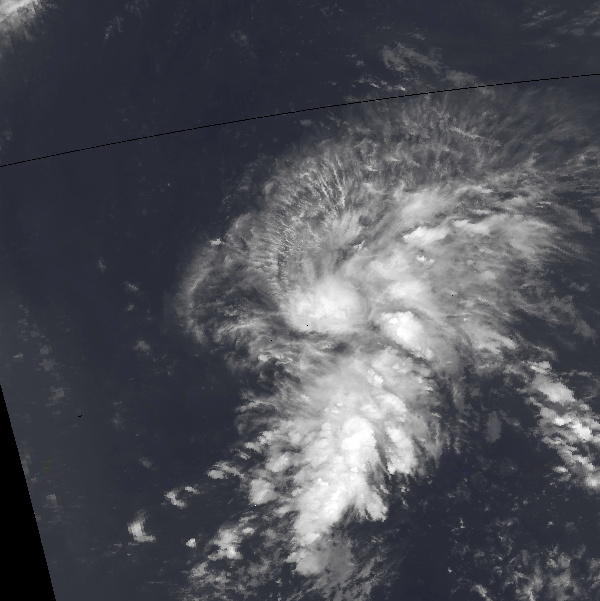
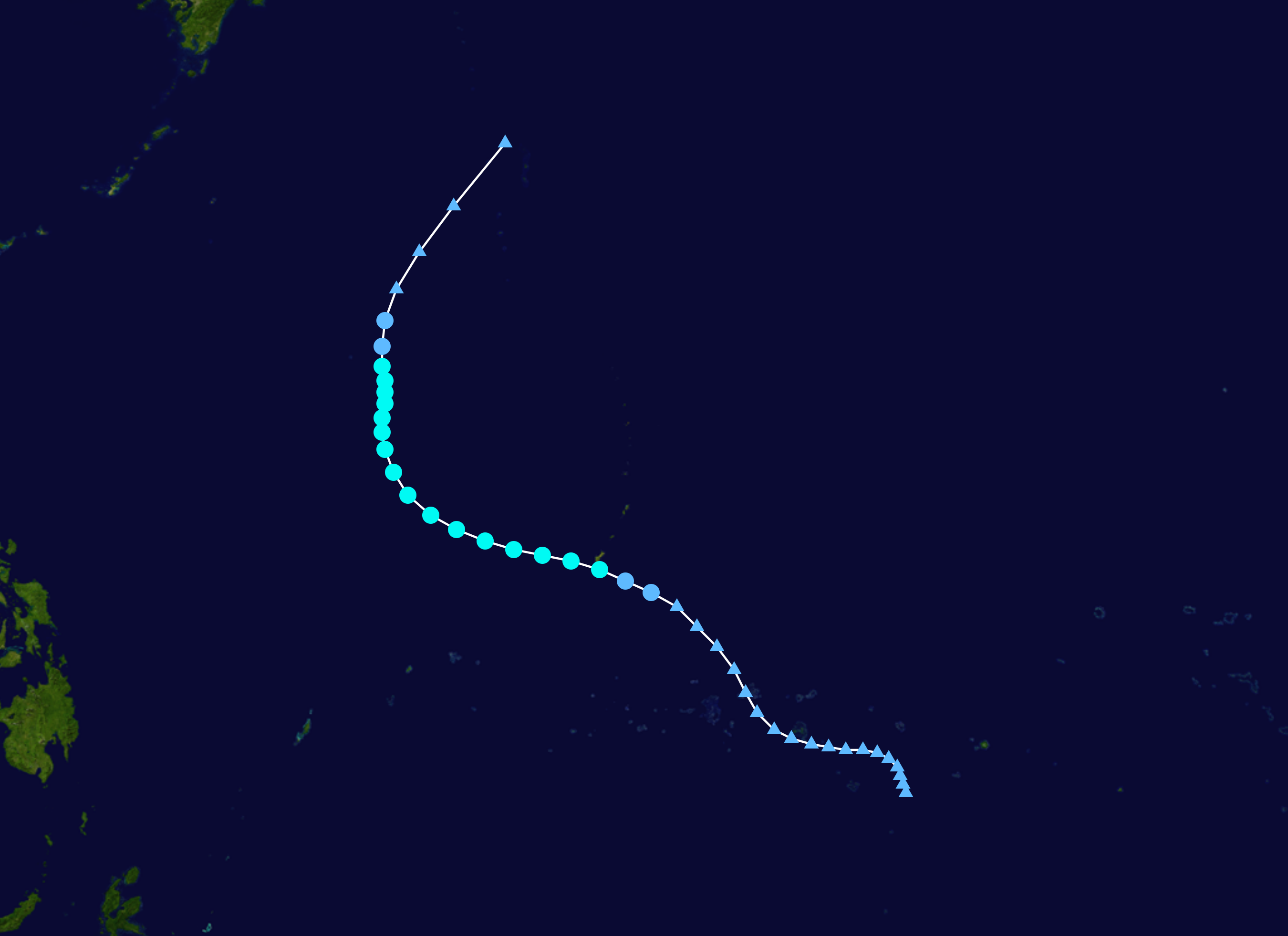
- Duration: June 4 – June 9
- Peak intensity: 55 km/h (35 mph) (10-min); 1002 hPa (mbar)

Eli stayed at sea.

=== Typhoon Faye (Bebeng) ===
- Typhoon (JMA)
- Category 3 typhoon (SSHWS)
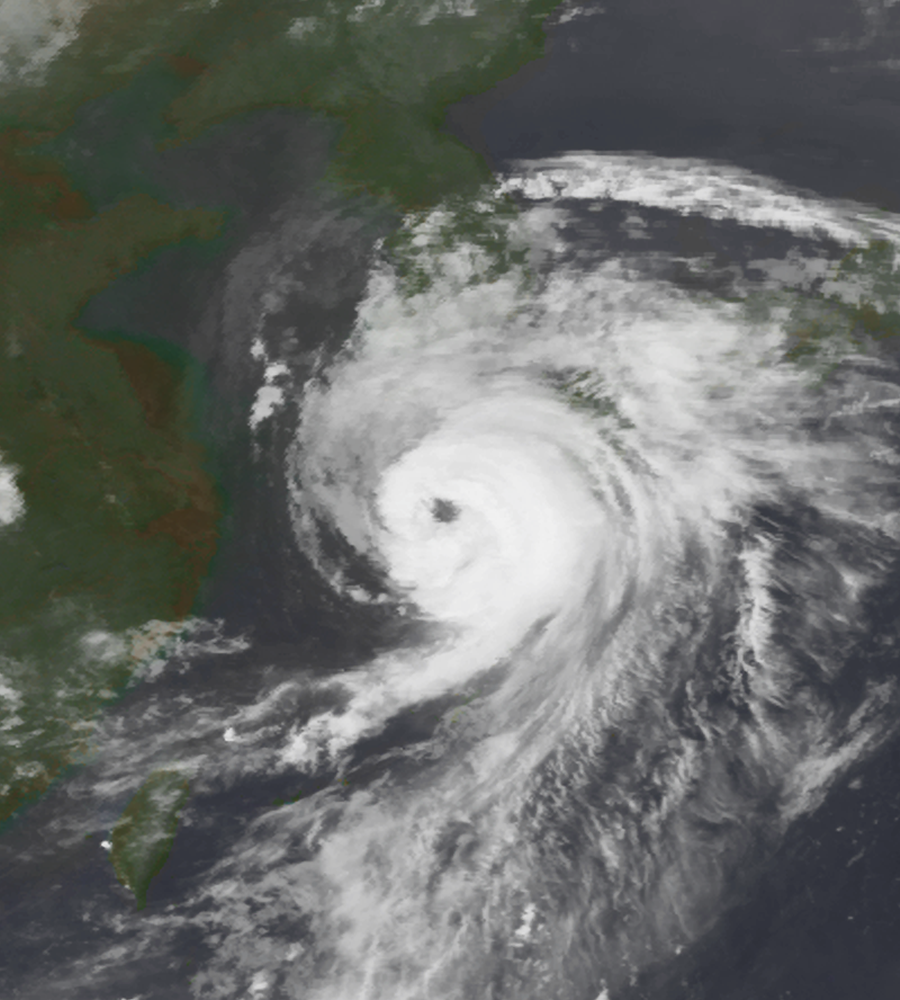
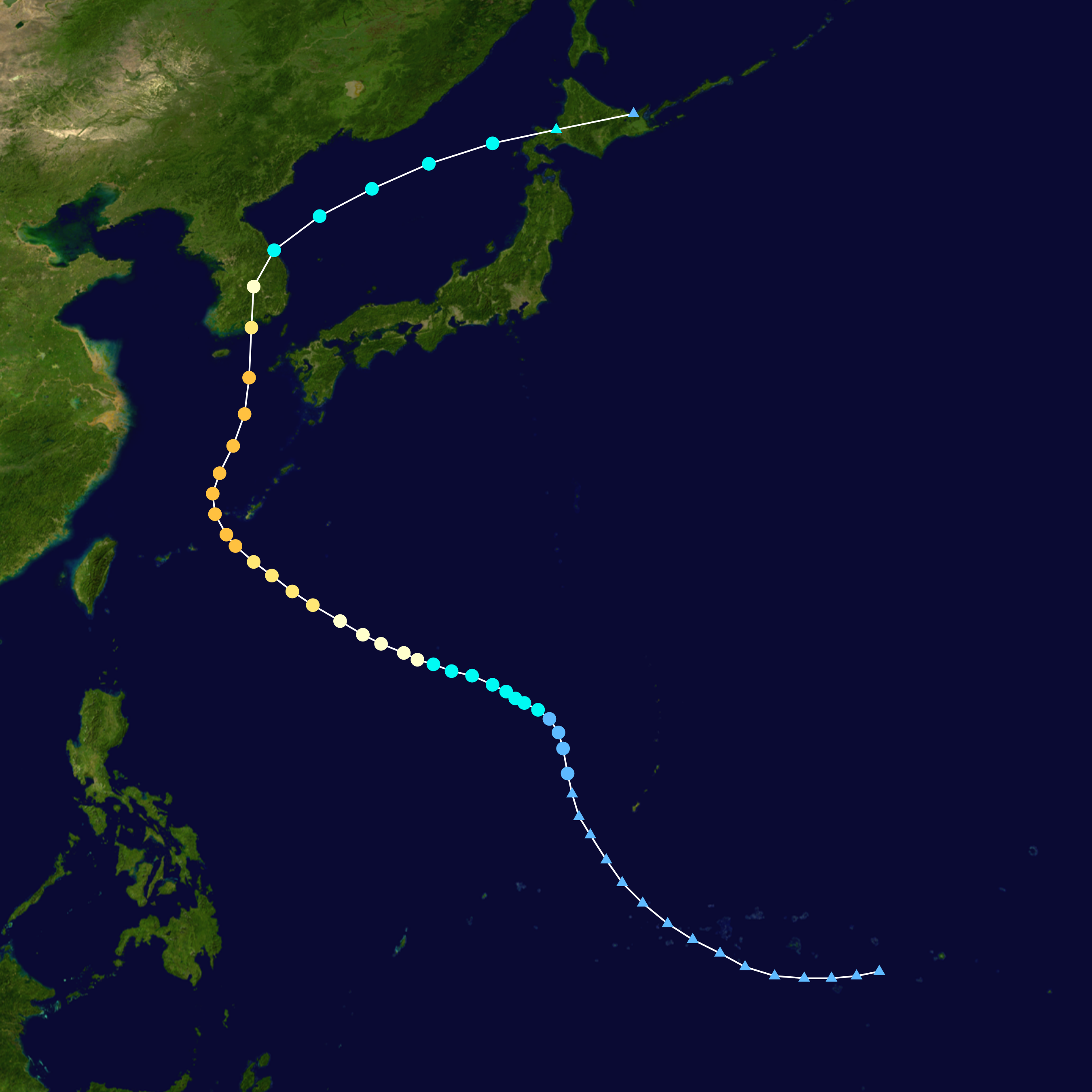
- Duration: July 16 – July 25
- Peak intensity: 140 km/h (85 mph) (10-min); 950 hPa (mbar)

Tropical Depression 05W formed on July 15 and was named Faye the next day as it intensified into a tropical storm. On July 19, Faye became the first typhoon of the season, tied for the second latest date of the first typhoon with 1977, only behind Otto of 1998. It tracked northwestward and eventually reached a peak of 120 mph (190 km/h) 1-min winds and a minimum pressure of 950 millibars. Faye turned northward, and after weakening slightly it hit the south coast of South Korea on the 23rd, before accelerating east-northeastwards and becoming extratropical. 16 people were reported dead, with moderate damage from flooding.

On July 23, 1995, when the typhoon passed South Korea, a rogue wave hitting Pusan Harbor, the largest port in South Korea, which resulted in two ships colliding. Damage in Japan totaled to ¥2.8 billion (US$30 million).

=== Tropical Depression 06W ===
- Tropical depression (JMA)
- Tropical storm (SSHWS)
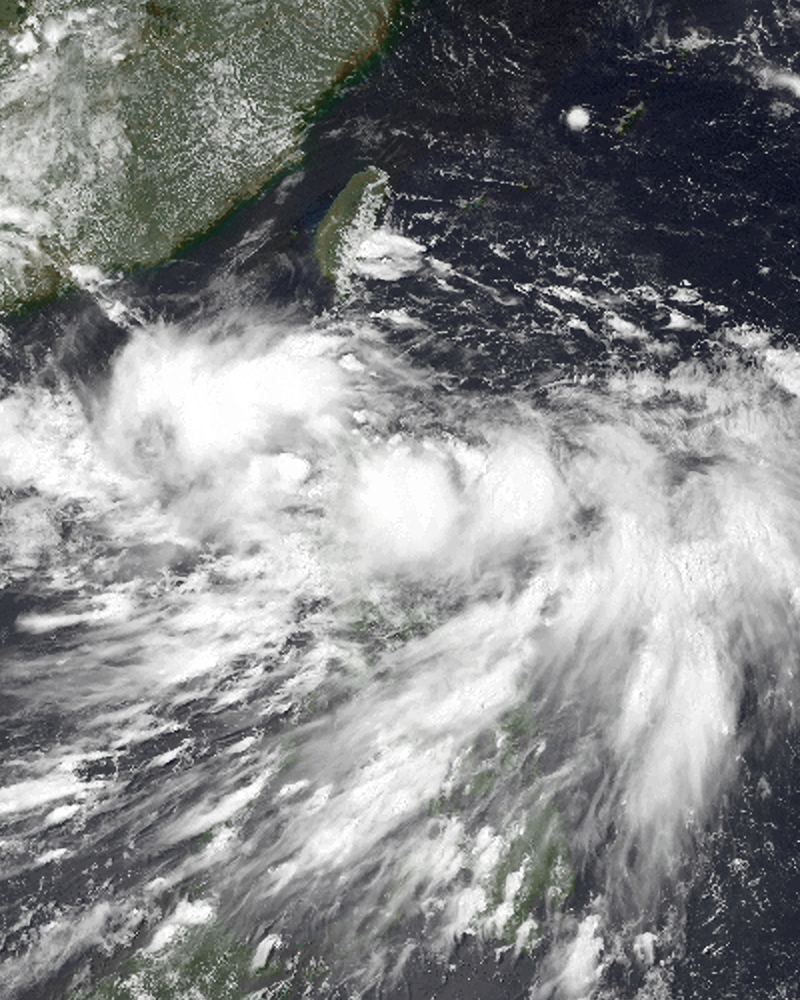
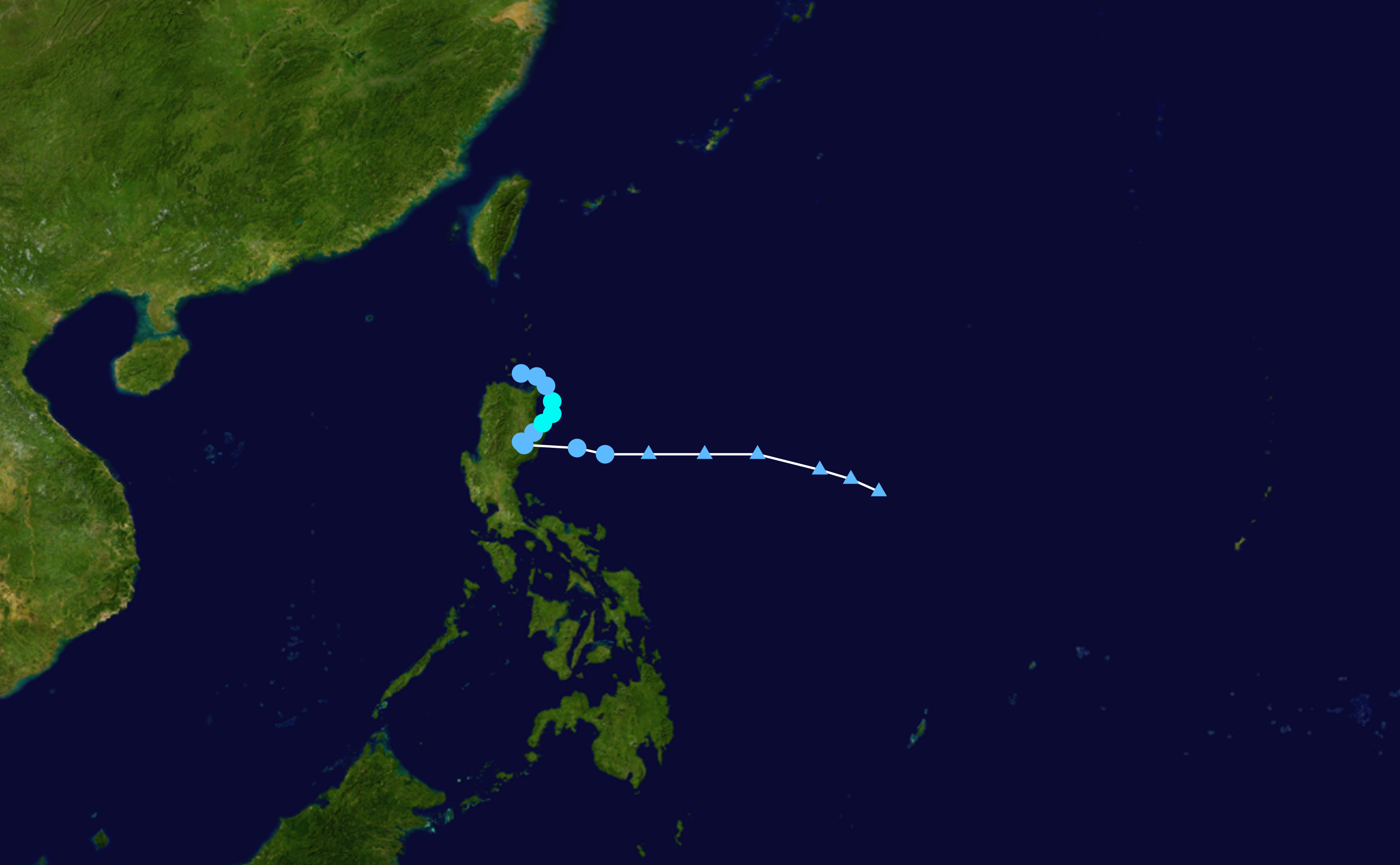
- Duration: July 25 – July 28
- Peak intensity: 55 km/h (35 mph) (10-min); 1004 hPa (mbar)

06W passed close to the Philippines.

=== Severe Tropical Storm Gary ===
- Severe tropical storm (JMA)
- Category 1 typhoon (SSHWS)
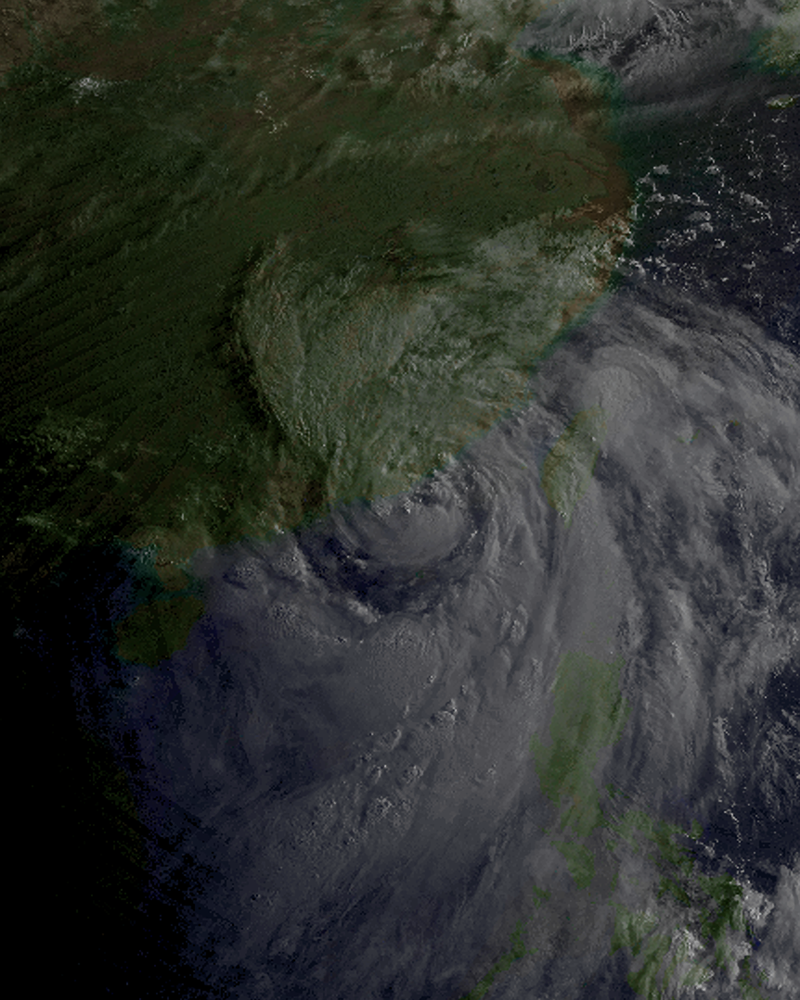
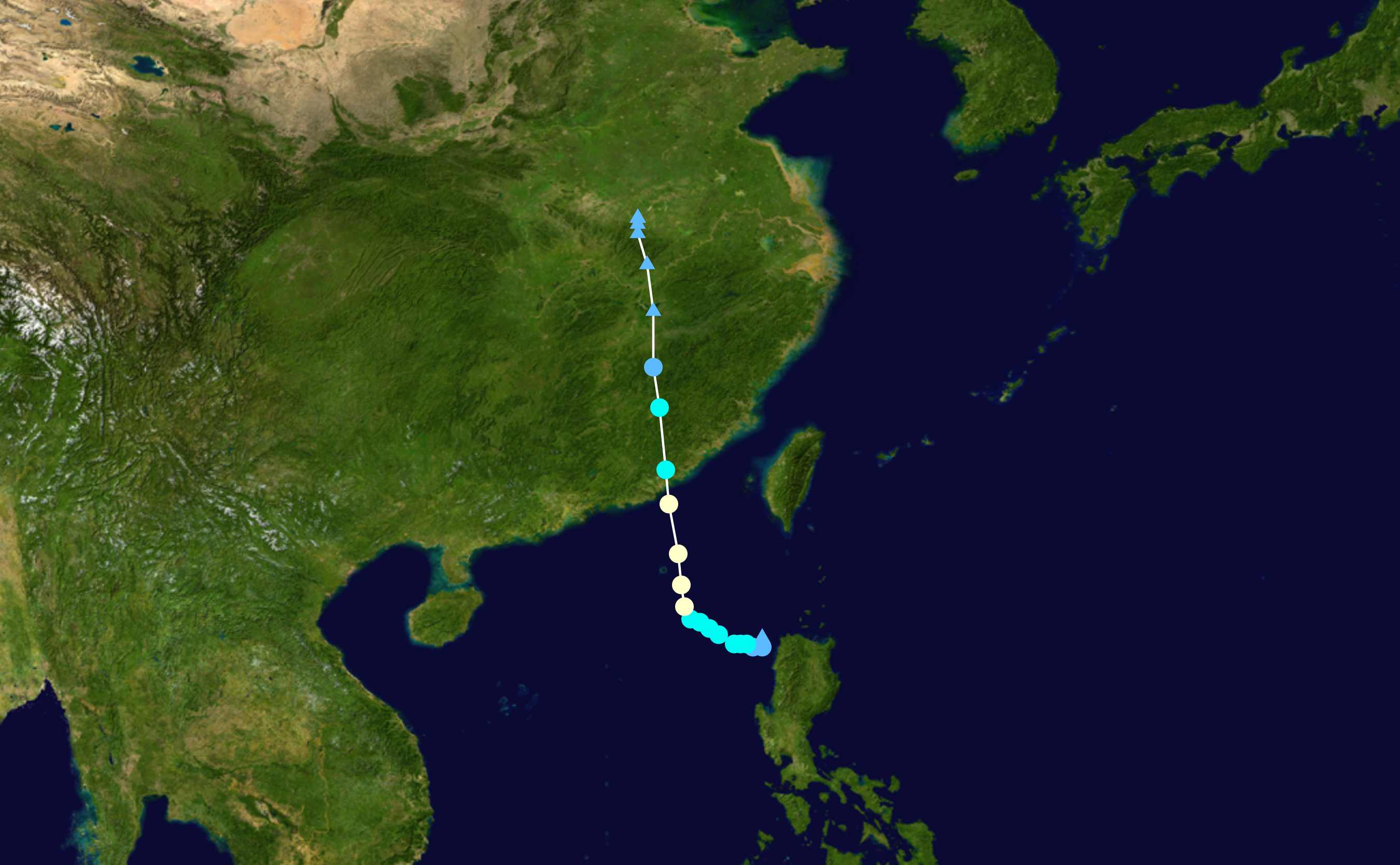
- Duration: July 28 – August 2
- Peak intensity: 100 km/h (65 mph) (10-min); 980 hPa (mbar)

On July 27, an area of low pressure near the Philippines later strengthened into Tropical Depression Gary. On July 28, Gary further strengthened into a tropical storm. After bringing torrential downpours and flooding to the Philippines, Gary moved northwest into the South China Sea. Gary intensified even further into a severe tropical storm on July 30 and made landfall near Shantou on July 31. On August 2, after moving inland, Gary dissipated.

Gary claimed four lives in Shantou. Near Taiwan, four fishing vessels sank, with two people dead and 19 others missing. Losses were at 200 million RMB (US$24 million).

=== Severe Tropical Storm Helen (Karing) ===
- Severe tropical storm (JMA)
- Category 1 typhoon (SSHWS)
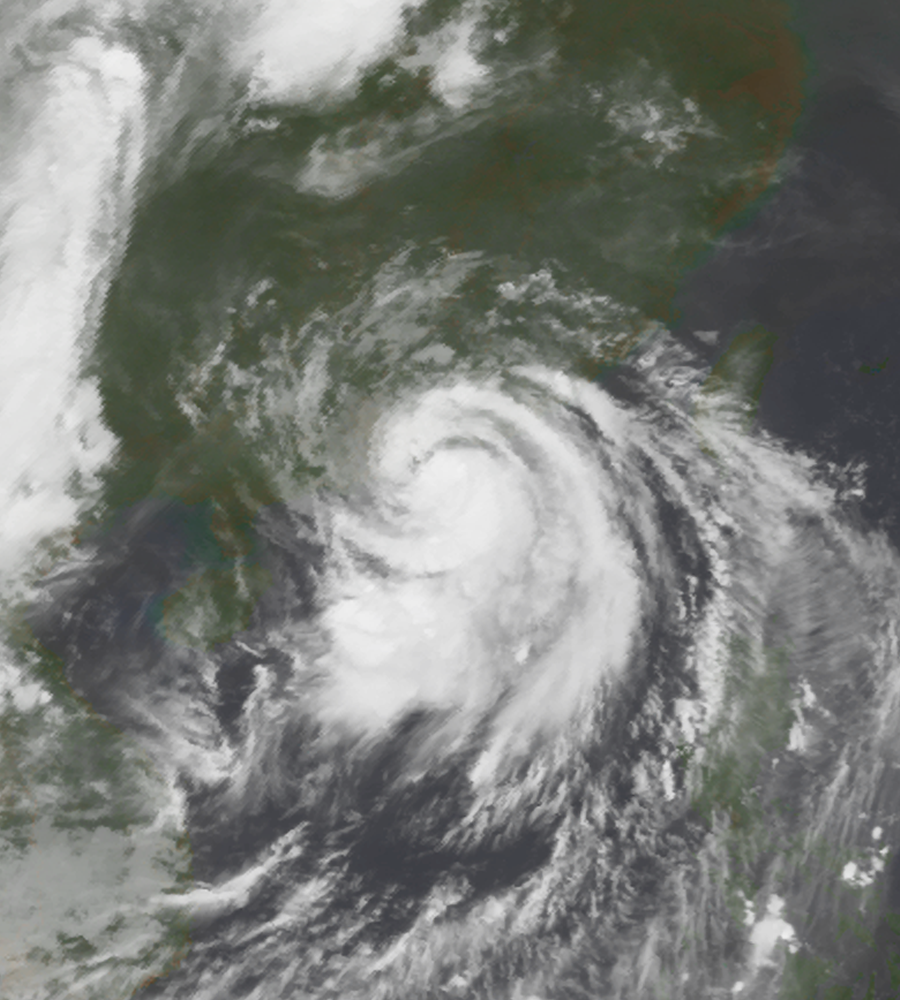
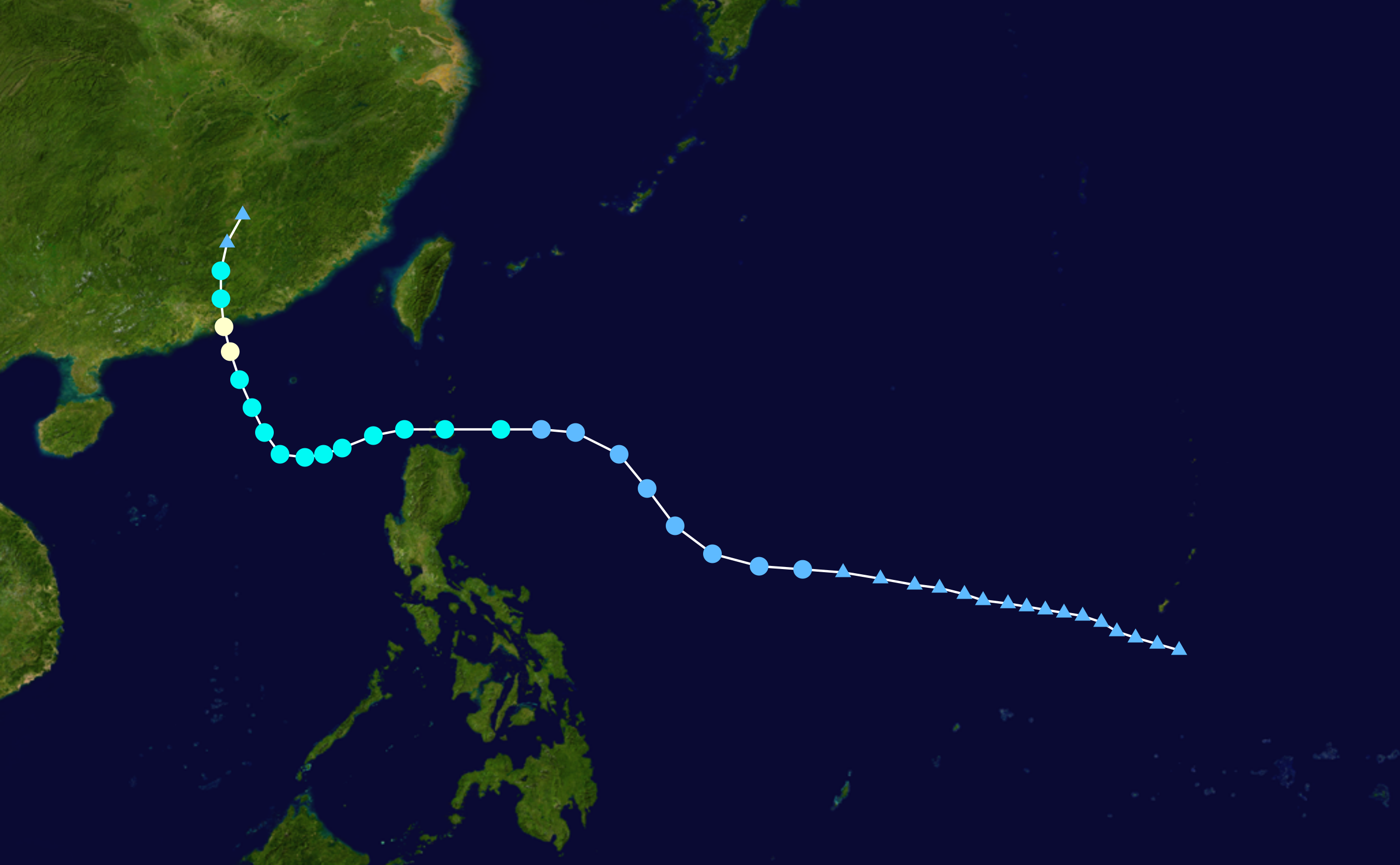
- Duration: August 7 – August 13
- Peak intensity: 110 km/h (70 mph) (10-min); 985 hPa (mbar)

On August 7, Helen formed as a tropical depression about 1200 km east of Manila. Moving northwestwards, Helen soon intensified into a tropical storm on August 9. On August 11, Helen further intensified into a typhoon and made landfall about 60 km northeast of Hong Kong. On August 13, Helen rapidly weakened and soon dissipated.

In Guangdong Helen claimed 23 lives. It also brought many landslides and flooding. Damages totaled to 1.33 billion RMB (US$160 million).

=== Tropical Storm Irving (Diding) ===
- Tropical storm (JMA)
- Tropical storm (SSHWS)
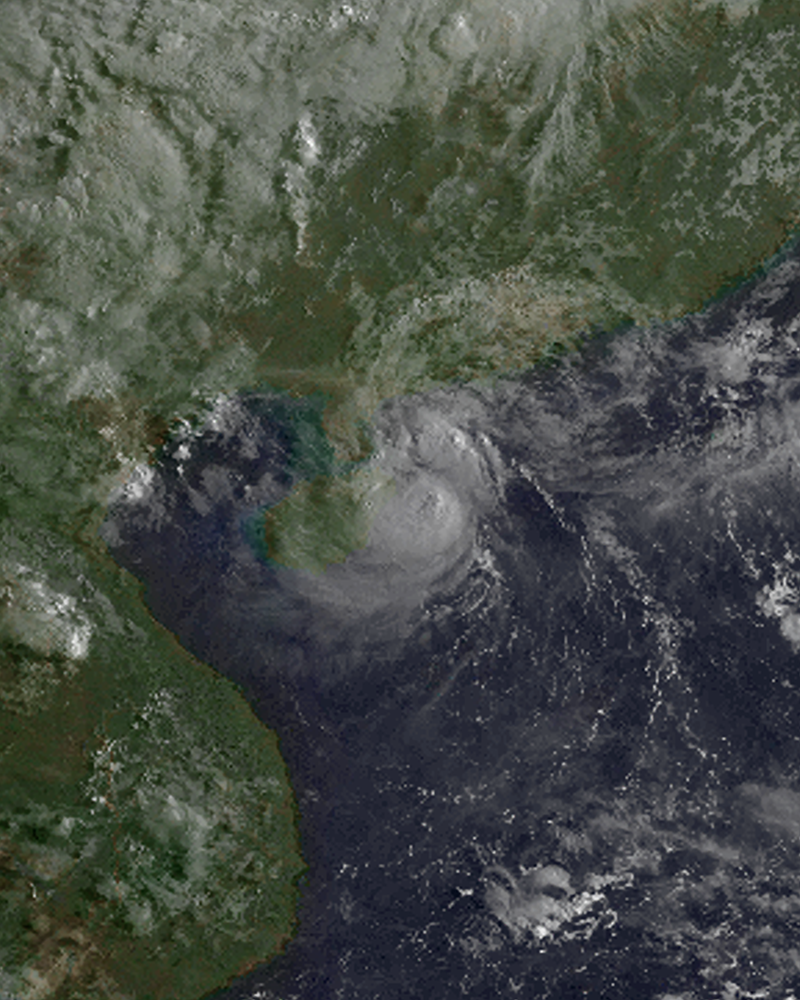
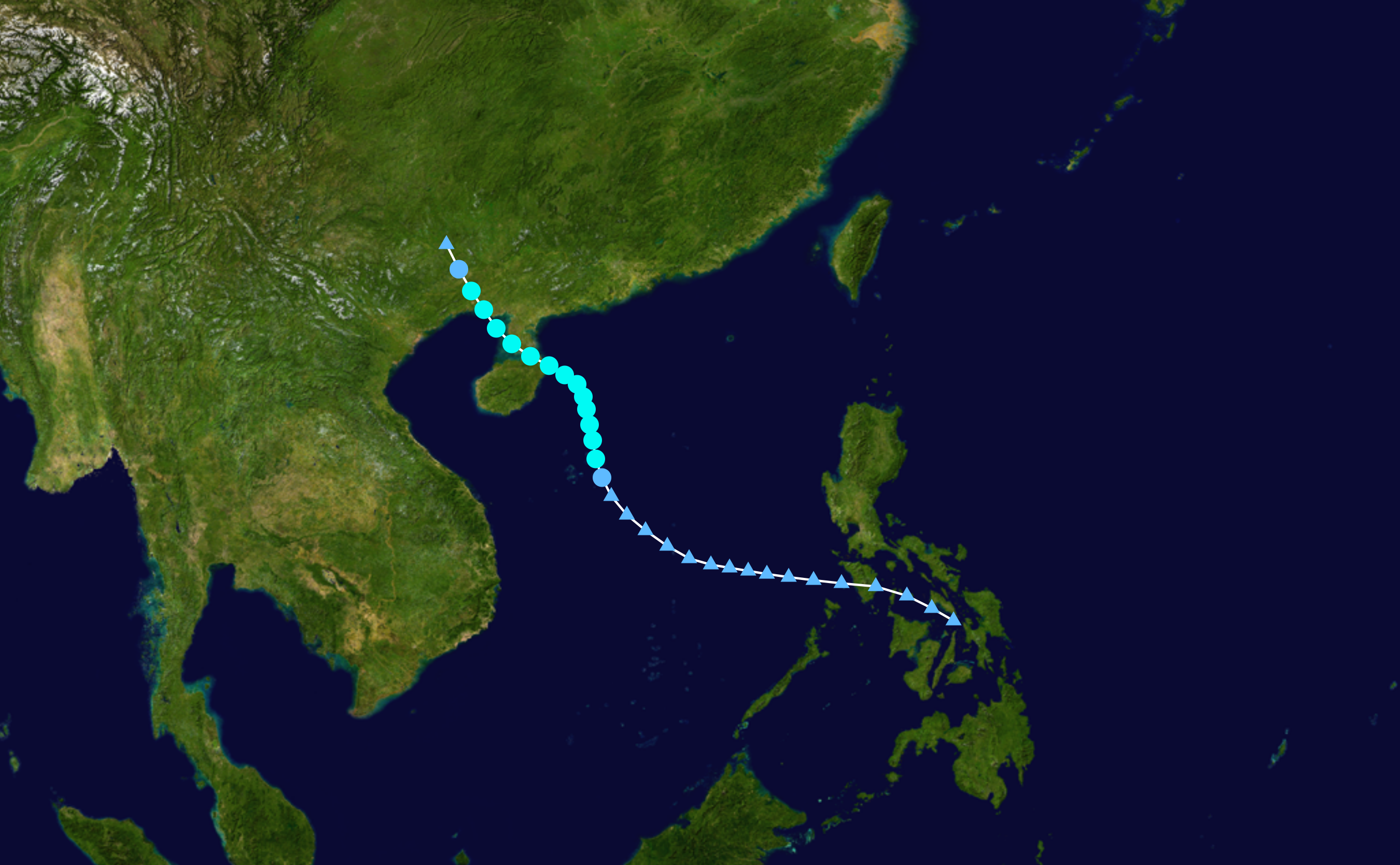
- Duration: August 17 – August 20
- Peak intensity: 85 km/h (50 mph) (10-min); 990 hPa (mbar)

On August 17, an area of low pressure in the South China Sea became Tropical Depression Irving. The following morning, Irving became a tropical storm and moved north at 15 km/h. On August 20, Irving again became a tropical depression, and made landfall on the Leizhou Peninsula. Irving then started losing strength rapidly and soon dissipated.

=== Tropical Storm Janis (Etang) ===
- Tropical storm (JMA)
- Tropical storm (SSHWS)
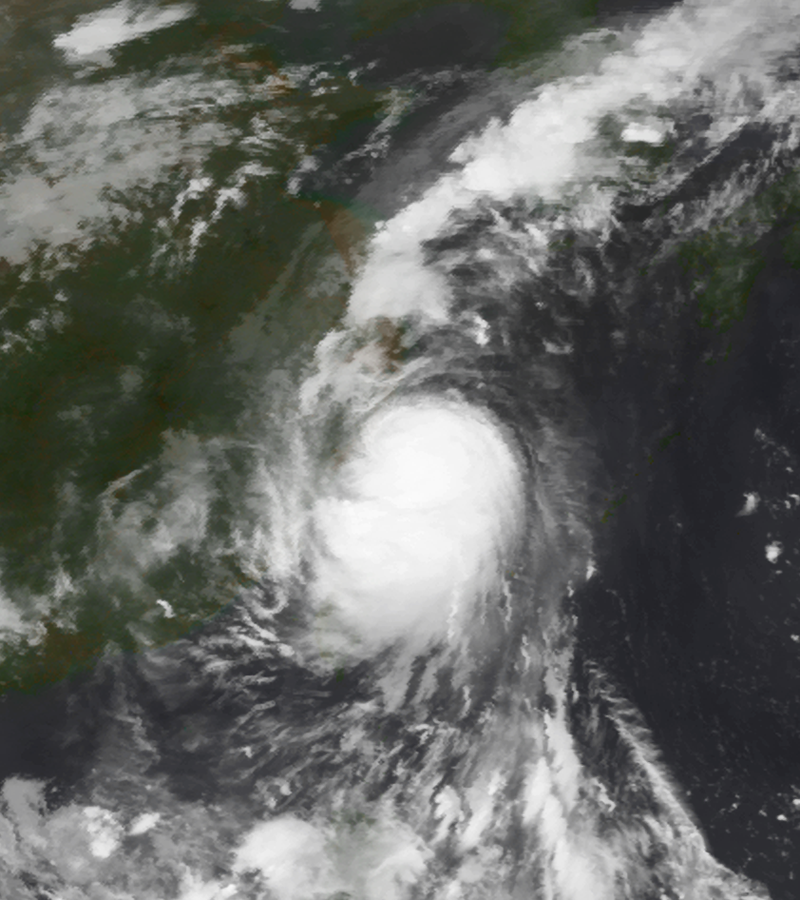
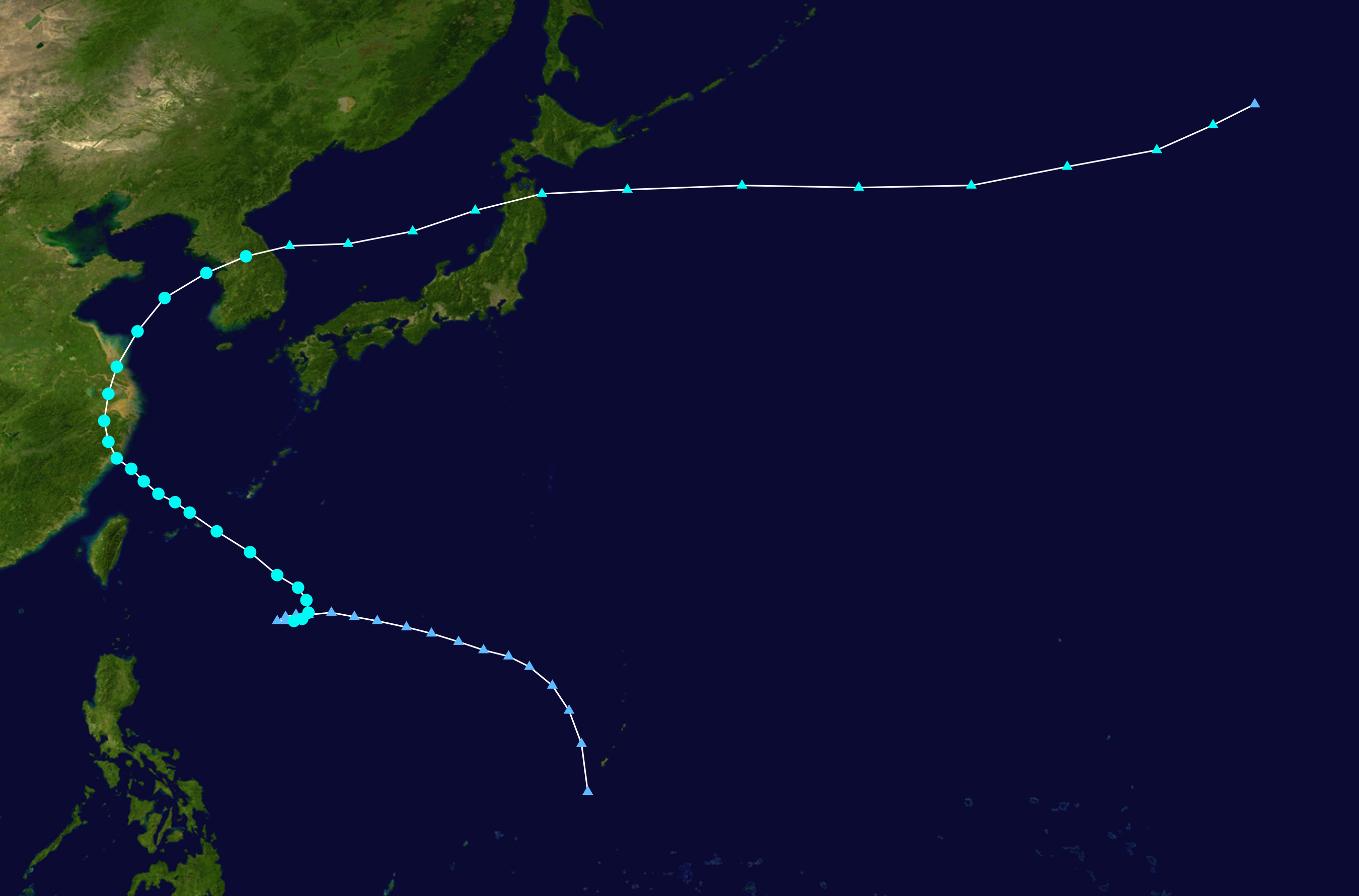
- Duration: August 20 – August 26
- Peak intensity: 85 km/h (50 mph) (10-min); 990 hPa (mbar)

An active monsoon trough developed Tropical Storm Janis, forming on August 17 and becoming a tropical storm on the 21st. Another tropical depression to Janis's west merged with the storm, weakening it rather than the typical strengthening after a merger. Janis continued northwestward, eventually restrengthening to a 65 mph tropical storm before hitting eastern China. It recurved to the northeast, and hit near Seoul, South Korea, on the 26th. The storm brought more rain to an area hit by a typhoon only a month before, causing an additional 45 deaths and $428.5 million in damage.

=== Tropical Depression 11W ===
- Tropical depression (SSHWS)
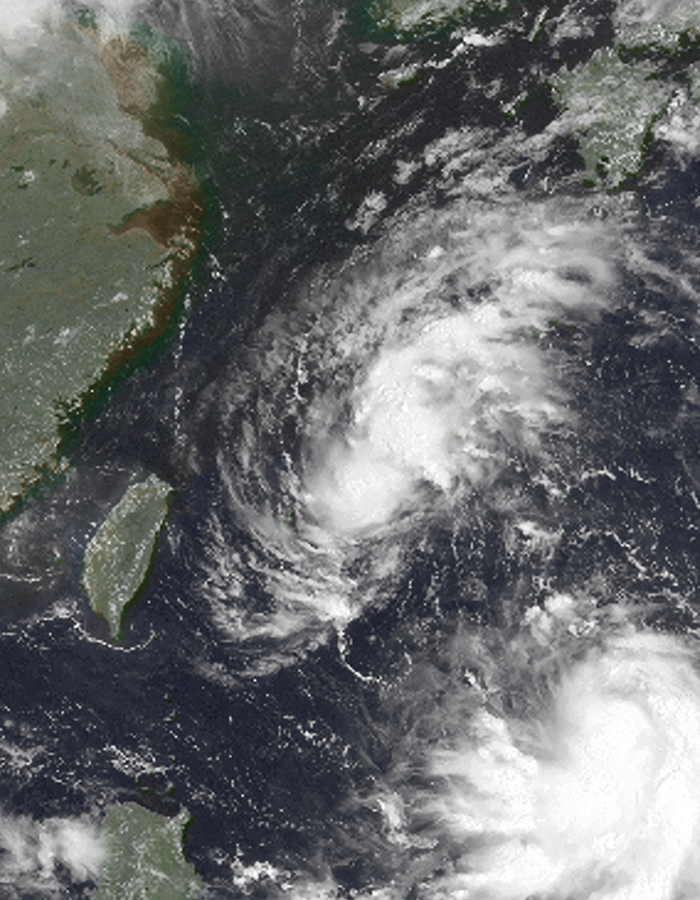
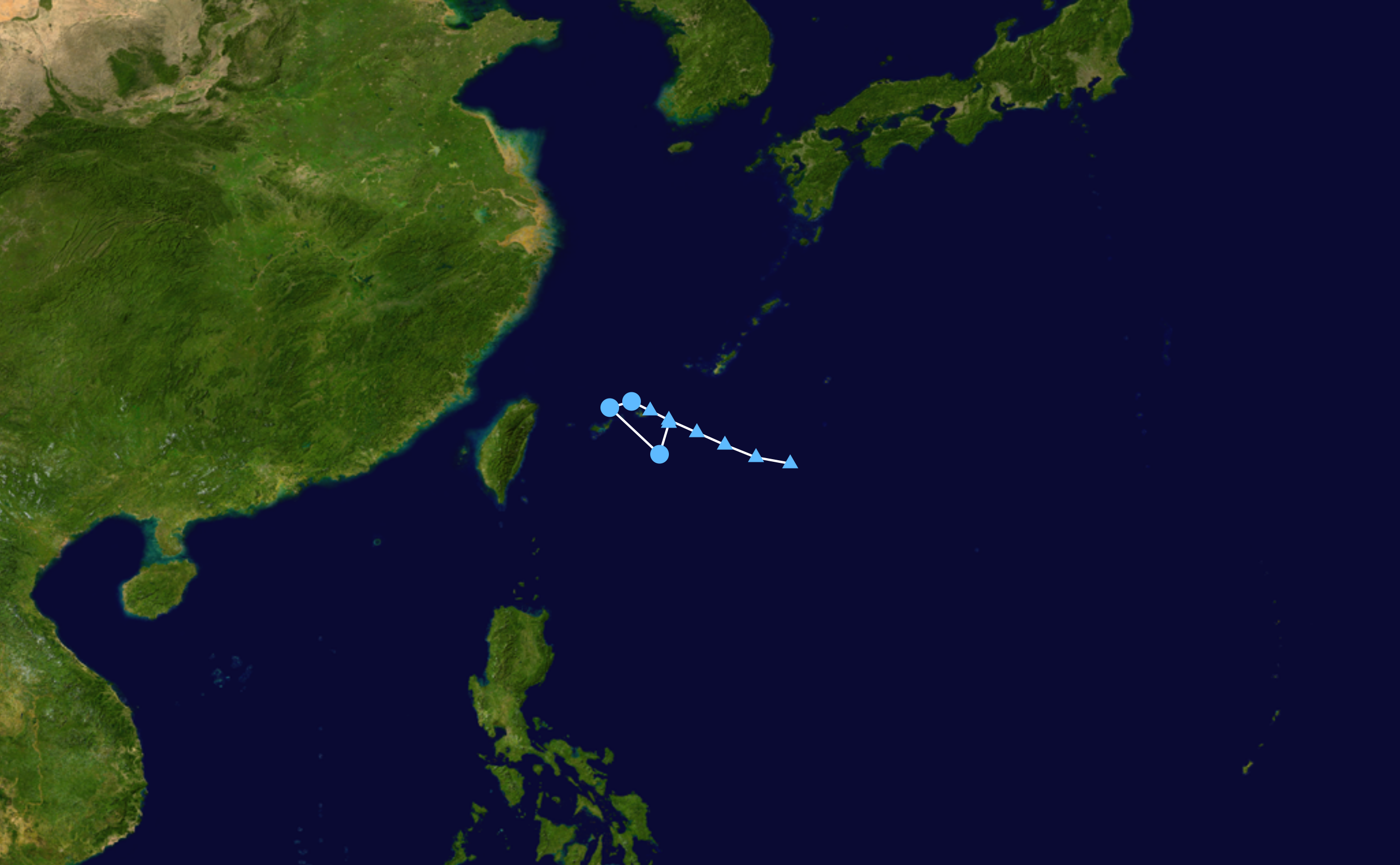
- Duration: August 21 – August 22
- Peak intensity: 45 km/h (30 mph) (1-min); 1002 hPa (mbar)

11W did not last for long.

=== Typhoon Kent (Gening) ===
- Very strong typhoon (JMA)
- Category 4 super typhoon (SSHWS)
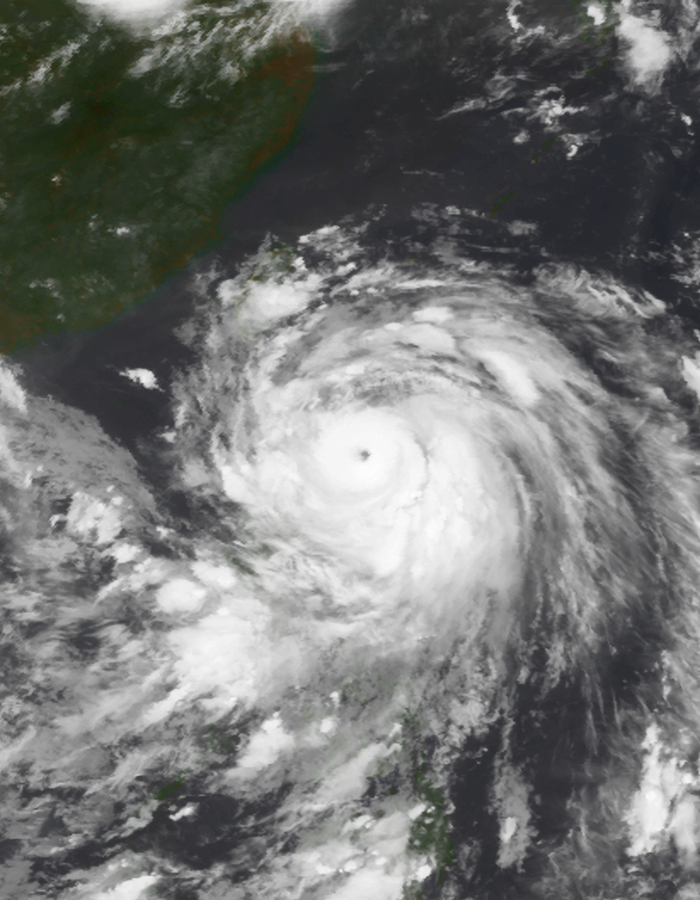
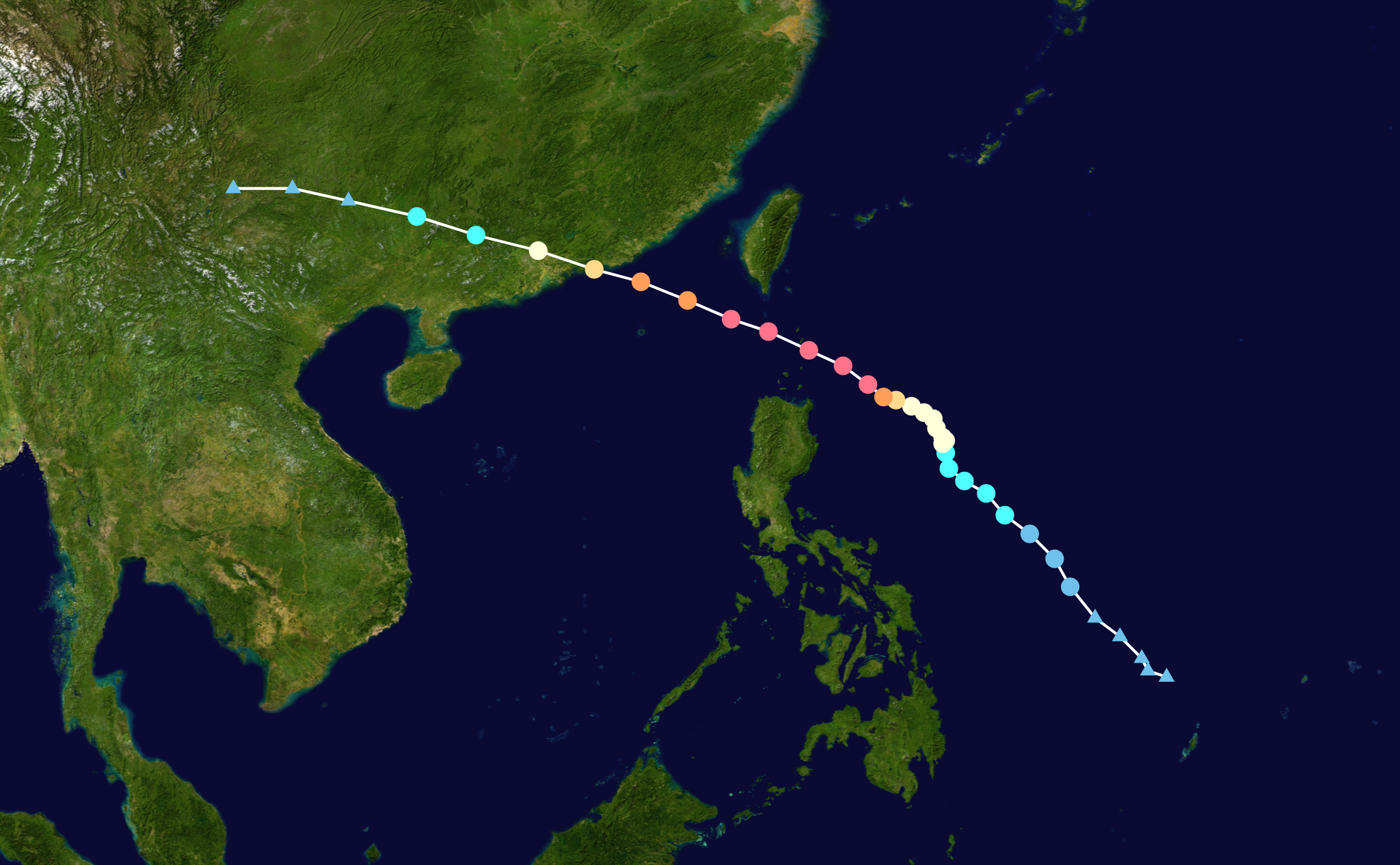
- Duration: August 24 – August 30
- Peak intensity: 155 km/h (100 mph) (10-min); 945 hPa (mbar)

A tropical wave was detected by the Joint Typhoon Warning Center on August 24. On August 25, it was classified as Tropical Depression 12W by the JTWC. The Japan Meteorological Agency (JMA) also upgraded the disturbance to a tropical depression later that day. At the same time, the Philippine Atmospheric, Geophysical and Astronomical Services Administration (PAGASA) named 12W, Gening from its list of pacific typhoon names. On August 26, Gening intensified into a tropical storm and was named Kent by the Joint Typhoon Warning Center. Kent then quickly intensified into a typhoon on August 27 as it drifted slowly west-northwest. It quickly intensified and reached peak intensity as a Category 4 super typhoon on August 29. The storm also reached a low barometric pressure of 945 millibars during that time. Continuing west-northwest, the eye of Typhoon Kent passed over the Philippine island of Basco. Kent then undergo an eyewall replacement cycle later that day and started to weaken. Kent also weakened below super typhoon status as it accelerated towards China. Kent made landfall in China on August 31 50 miles (80 km) northeast of Hong Kong. After landfall, the Joint Typhoon Warning Center issued its final warning on September 1 as Kent dissipated. The Japan Meteorological Agency also issued its final advisory on Kent.

Kent caused 52 casualties, as well as $89 million in damage (1995 USD).

=== Severe Tropical Storm Lois ===
- Severe tropical storm (JMA)
- Category 1 typhoon (SSHWS)
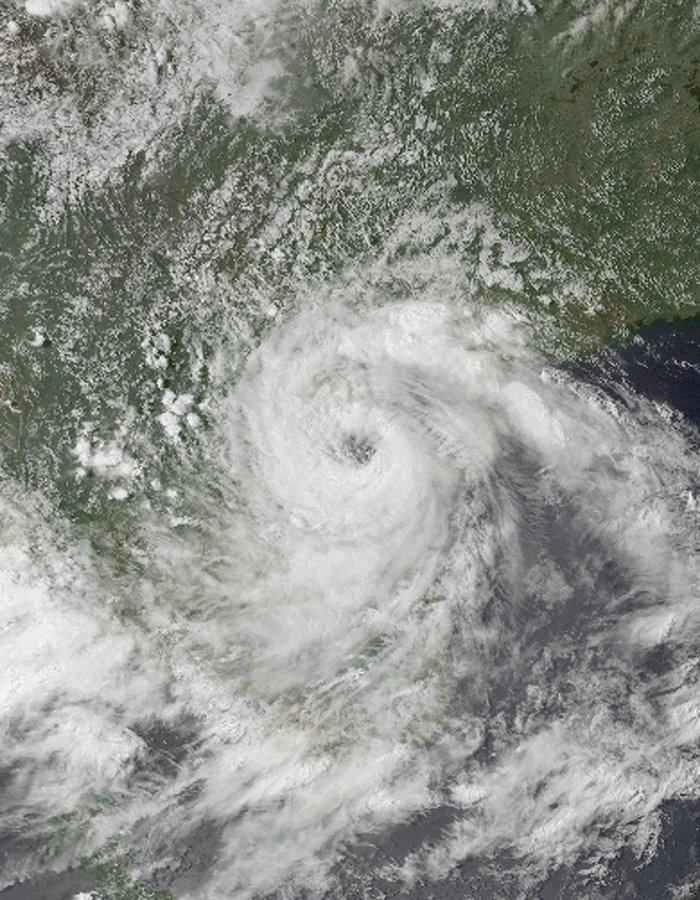
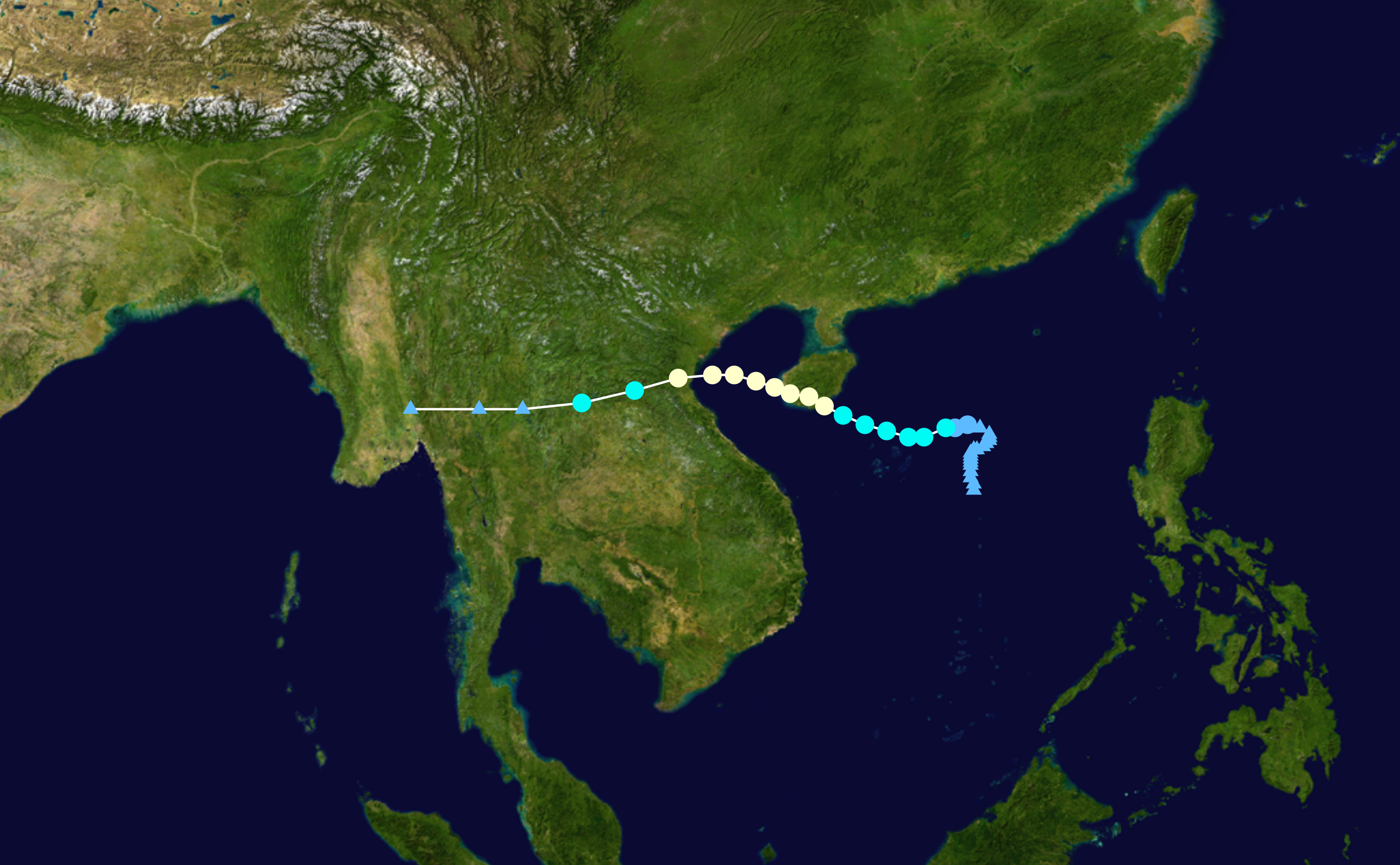
- Duration: August 24 – August 31
- Peak intensity: 95 km/h (60 mph) (10-min); 980 hPa (mbar)

Lois hit Vietnam as a typhoon.

=== Typhoon Mark ===
- Typhoon (JMA)
- Category 2 typhoon (SSHWS)
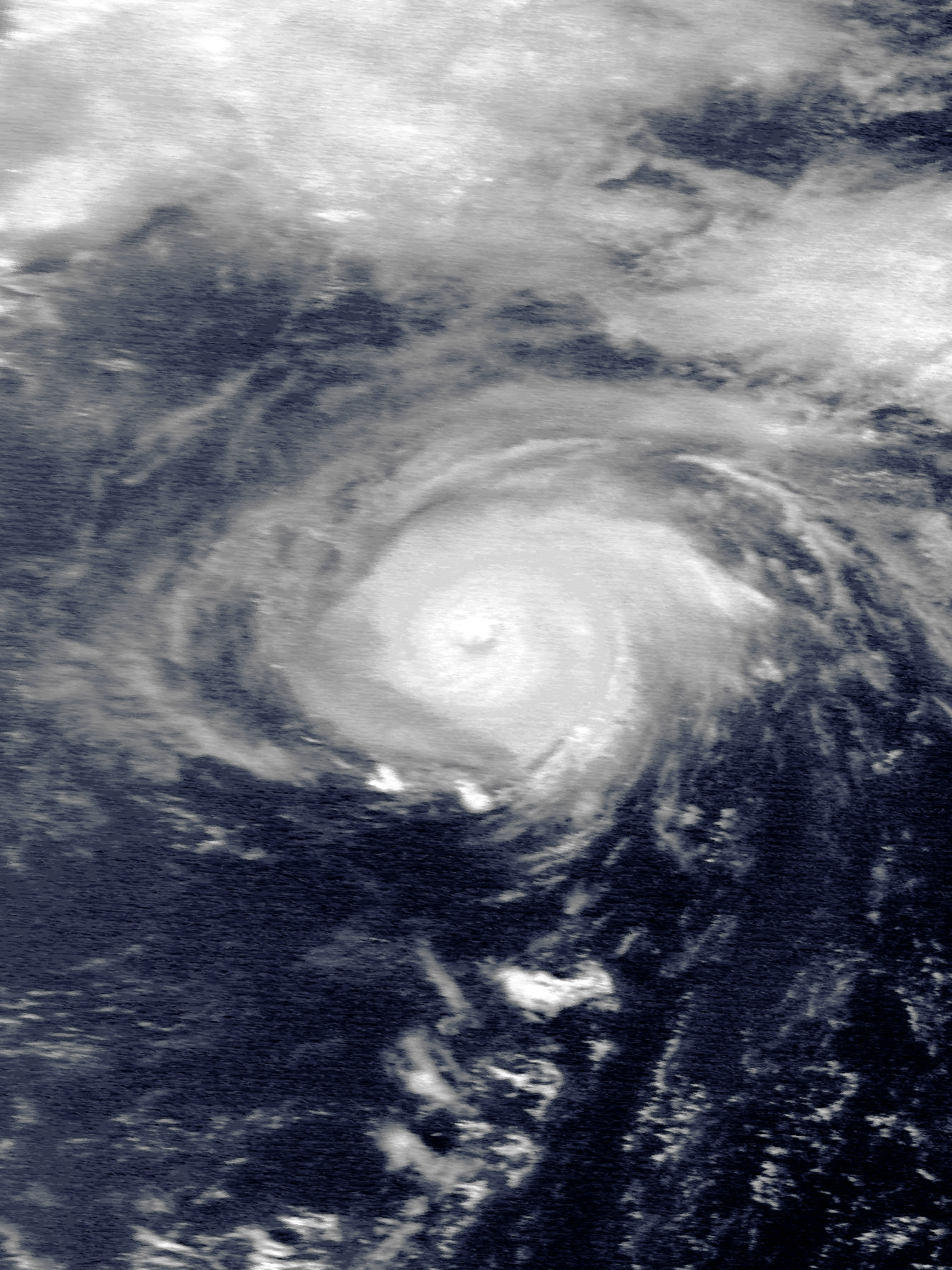
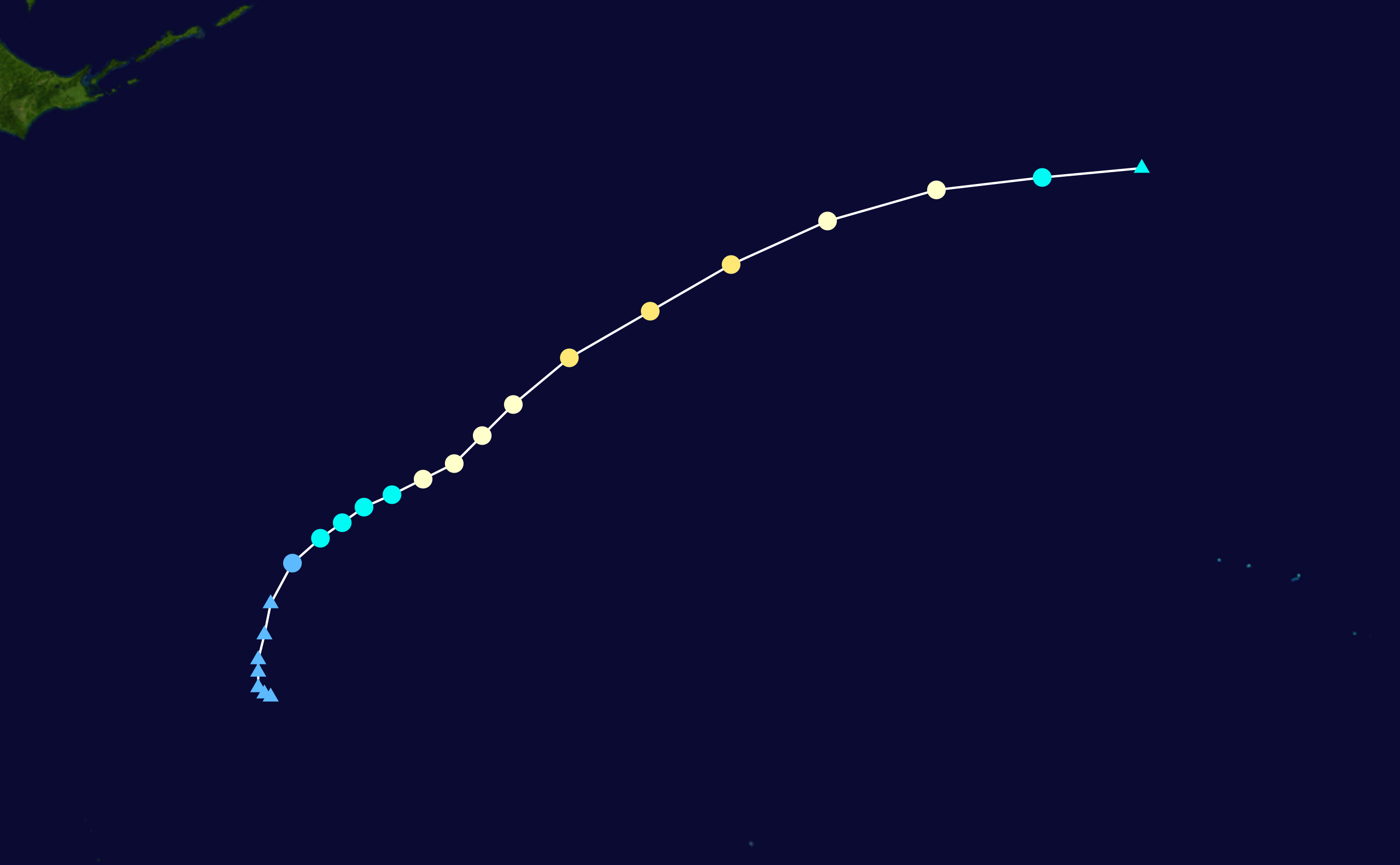
- Duration: August 30 – September 2
- Peak intensity: 120 km/h (75 mph) (10-min); 985 hPa (mbar)

Mark raced off the northeast away from land.

=== Tropical Storm Nina (Helming) ===
- Tropical storm (JMA)
- Tropical storm (SSHWS)
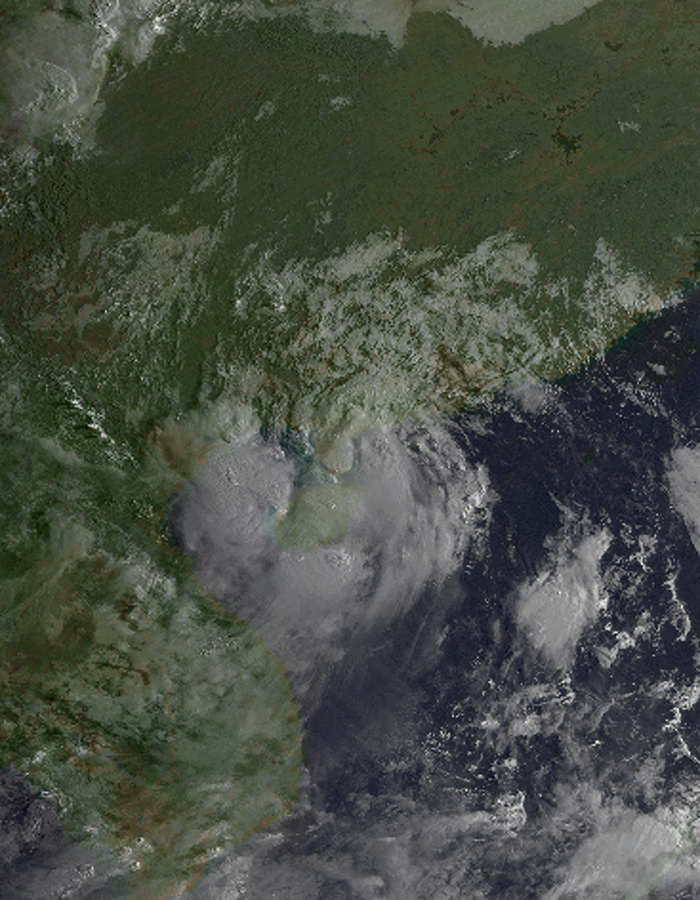
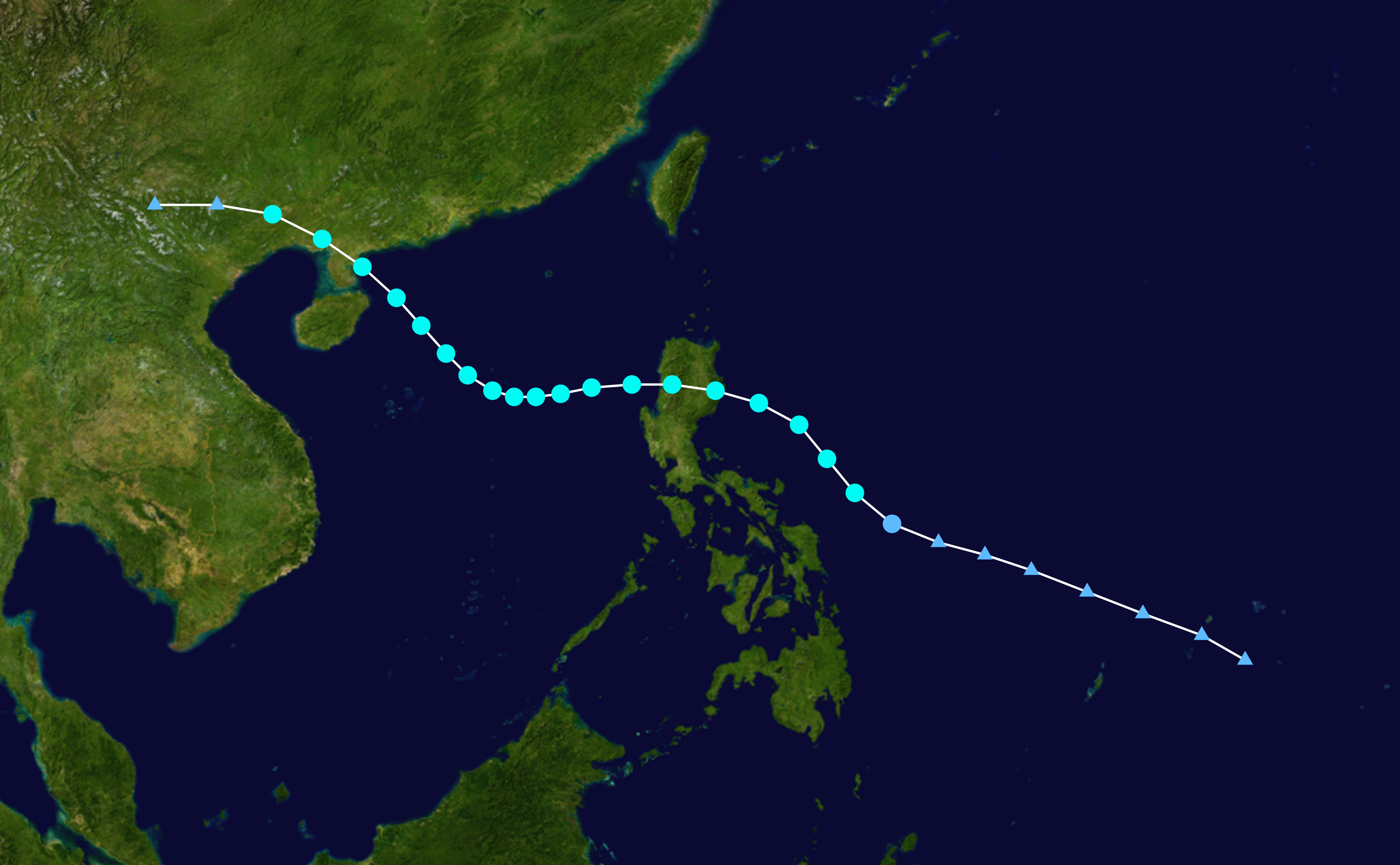
- Duration: September 2 – September 7
- Peak intensity: 75 km/h (45 mph) (10-min); 992 hPa (mbar)

Nina hit the Philippines and China.

=== Tropical Depression 16W ===
- Tropical depression (HKO)
- Tropical depression (SSHWS)
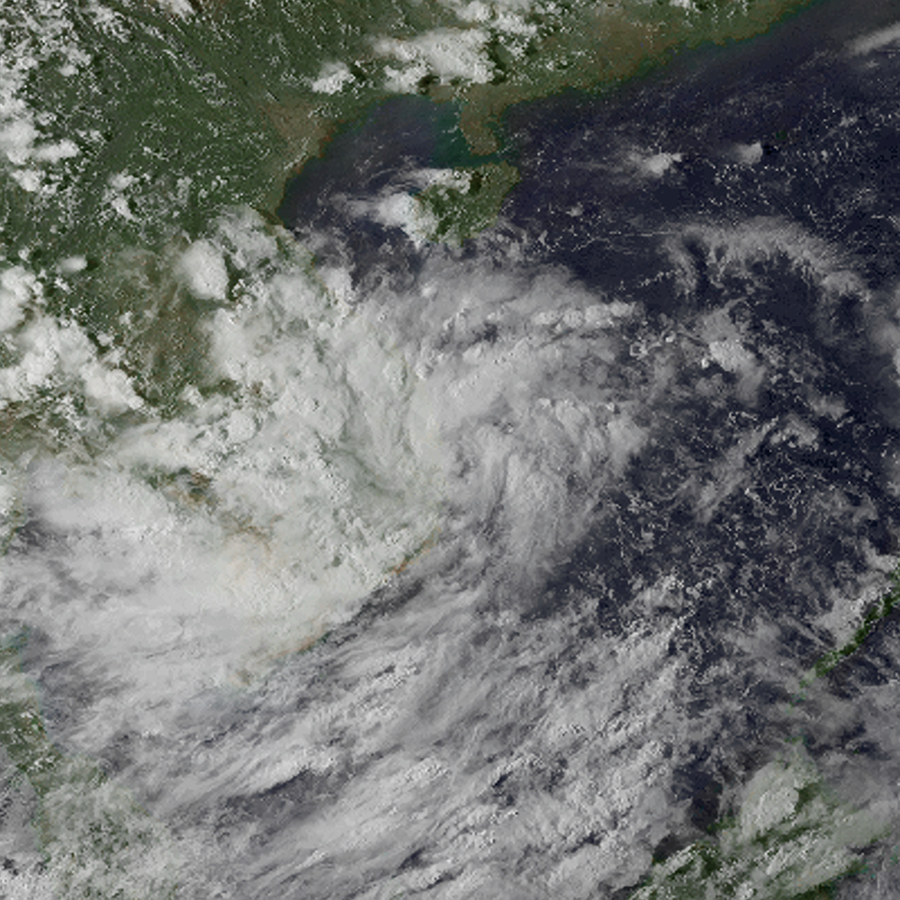
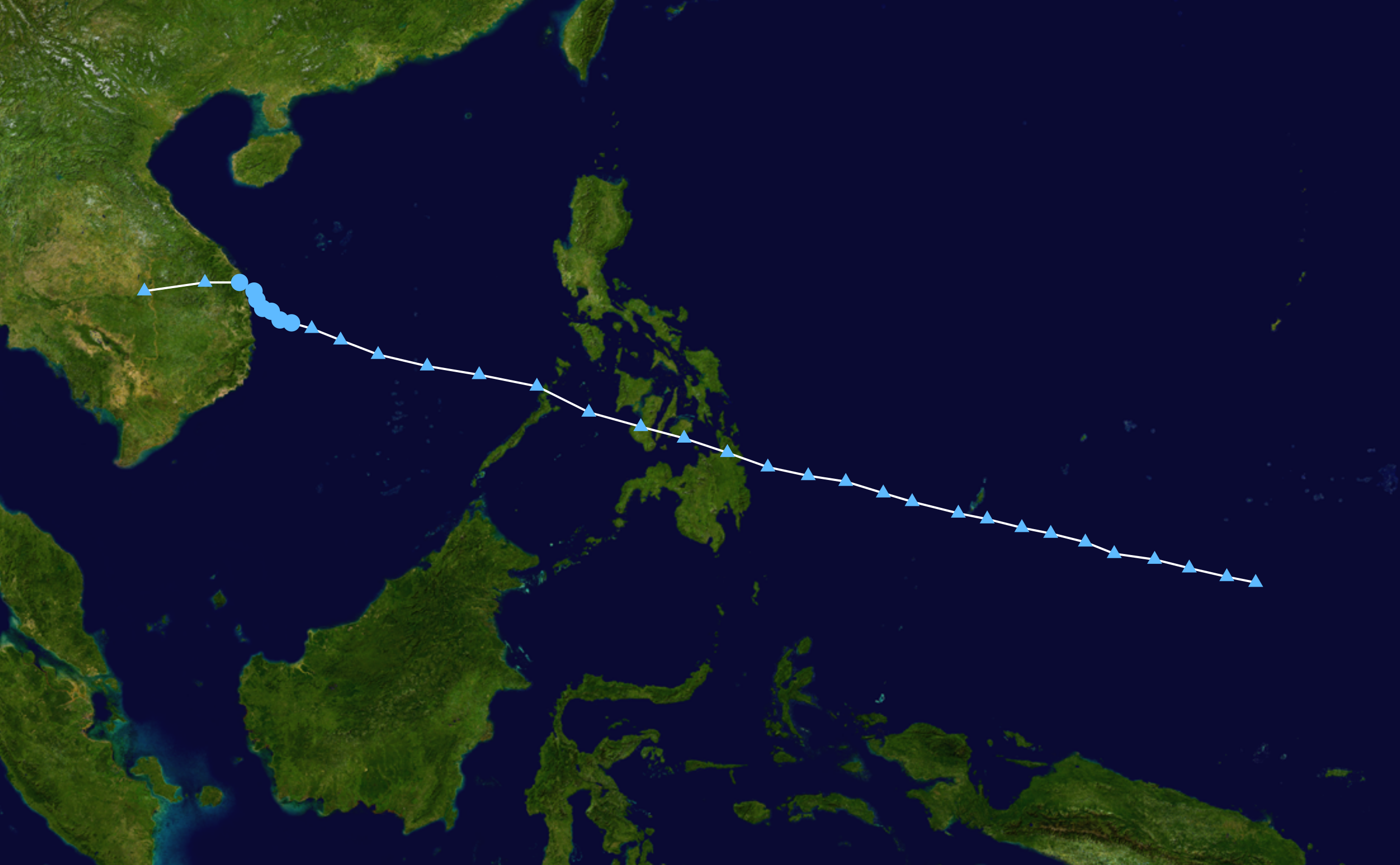
- Duration: September 5 – September 10
- Peak intensity: 45 km/h (30 mph) (10-min); 1005 hPa (mbar)

16W was a weak but long lived depression that passed through the Philippines.

=== Typhoon Oscar ===
- Very strong typhoon (JMA)
- Category 5 super typhoon (SSHWS)
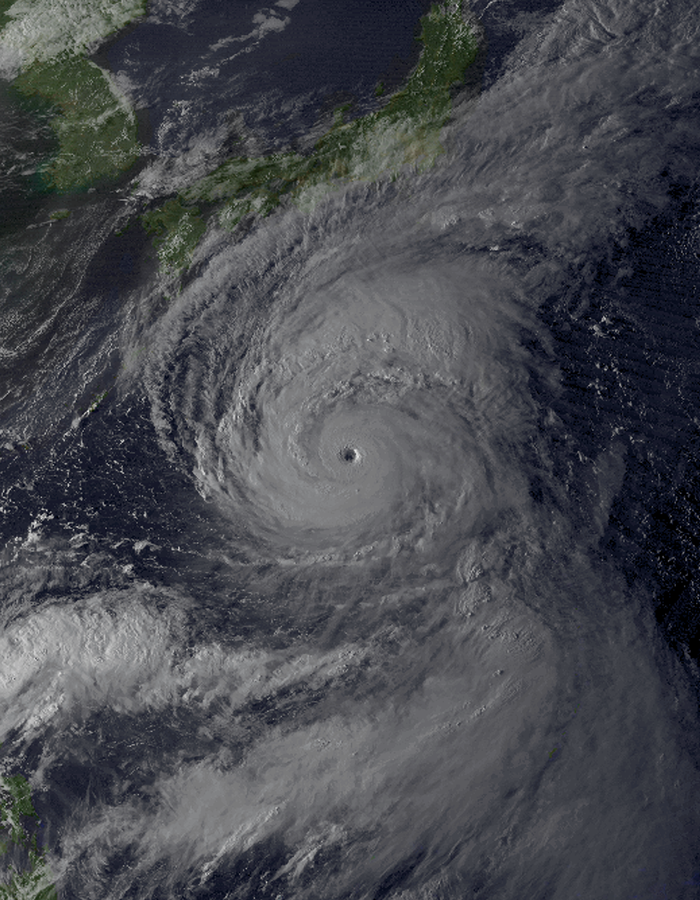
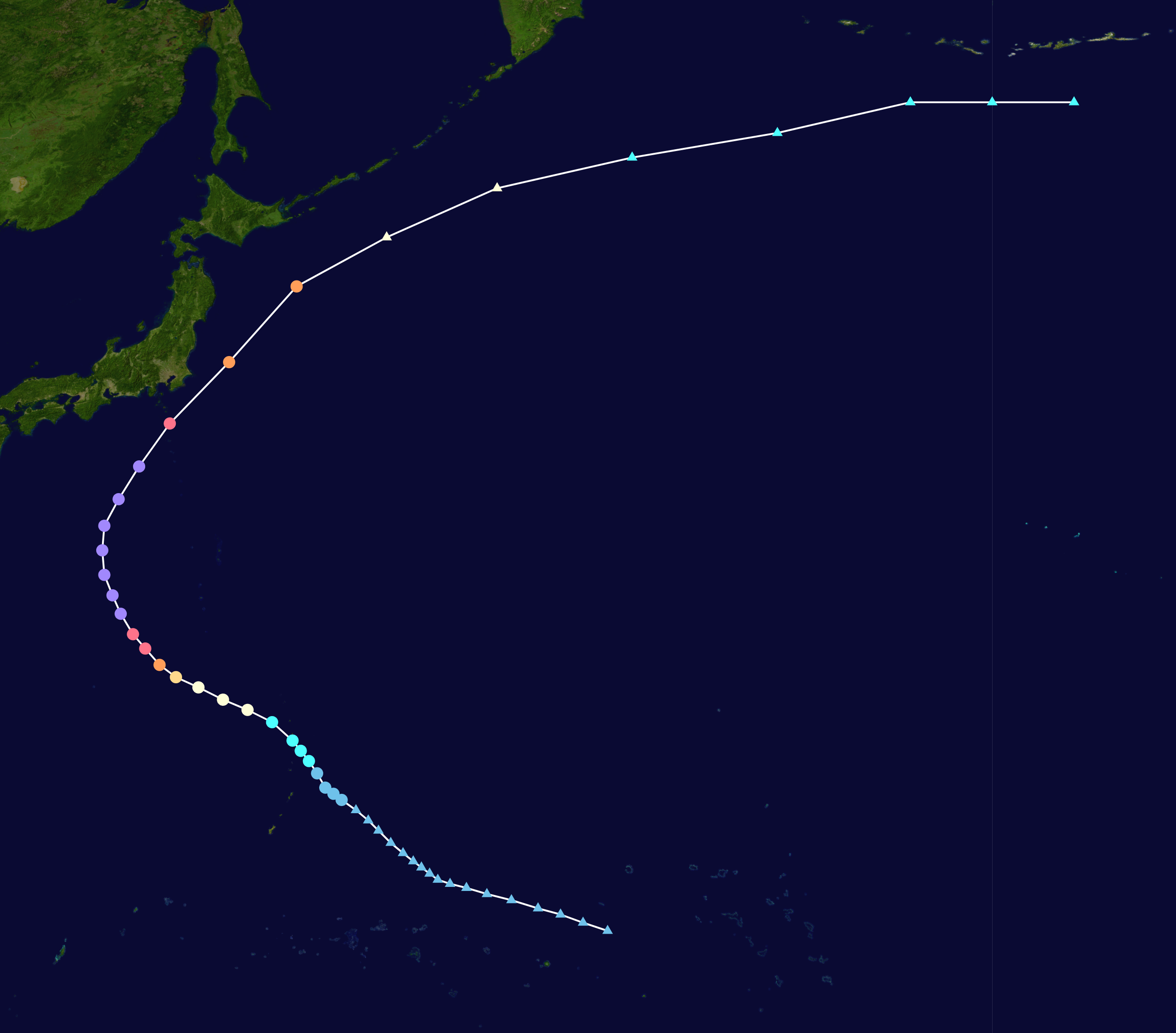
- Duration: September 12 – September 17
- Peak intensity: 185 km/h (115 mph) (10-min); 925 hPa (mbar)

In Tokyo, numerous buildings sustained severe damage from high winds and several major highways were shut down. At least 20 people were injured by flying debris in Japan. One person was killed in a landslide and another drowned in a flood. Seven more people were killed by Typhoon Oscar throughout the country. Three other people were also listed as missing due to the storm. Losses from the storm throughout Japan amounted to 612.3 million yen (US$6.7 million).

=== Typhoon Polly (Ising) ===
- Typhoon (JMA)
- Category 2 typhoon (SSHWS)
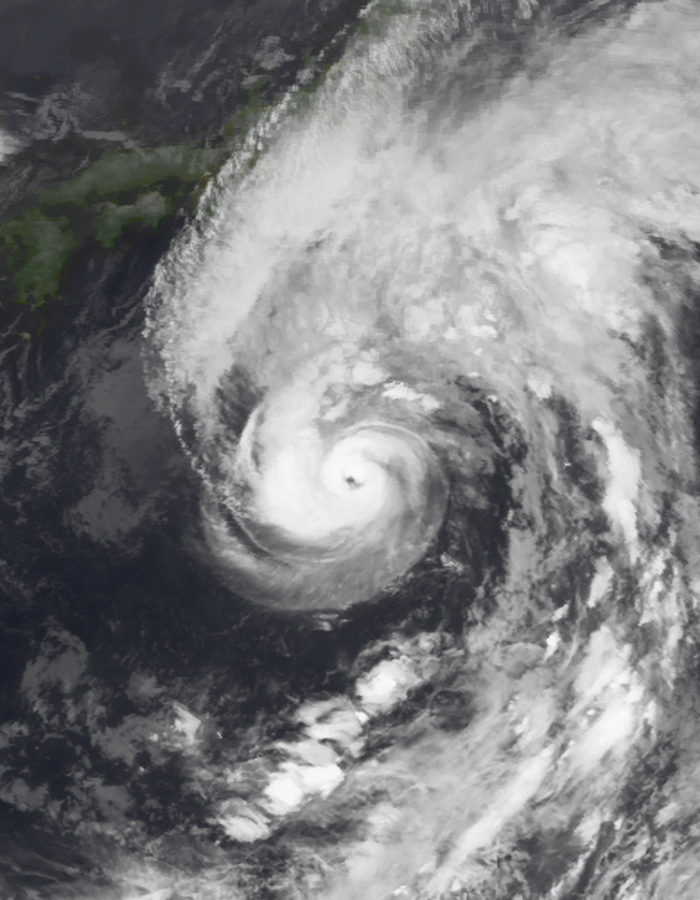
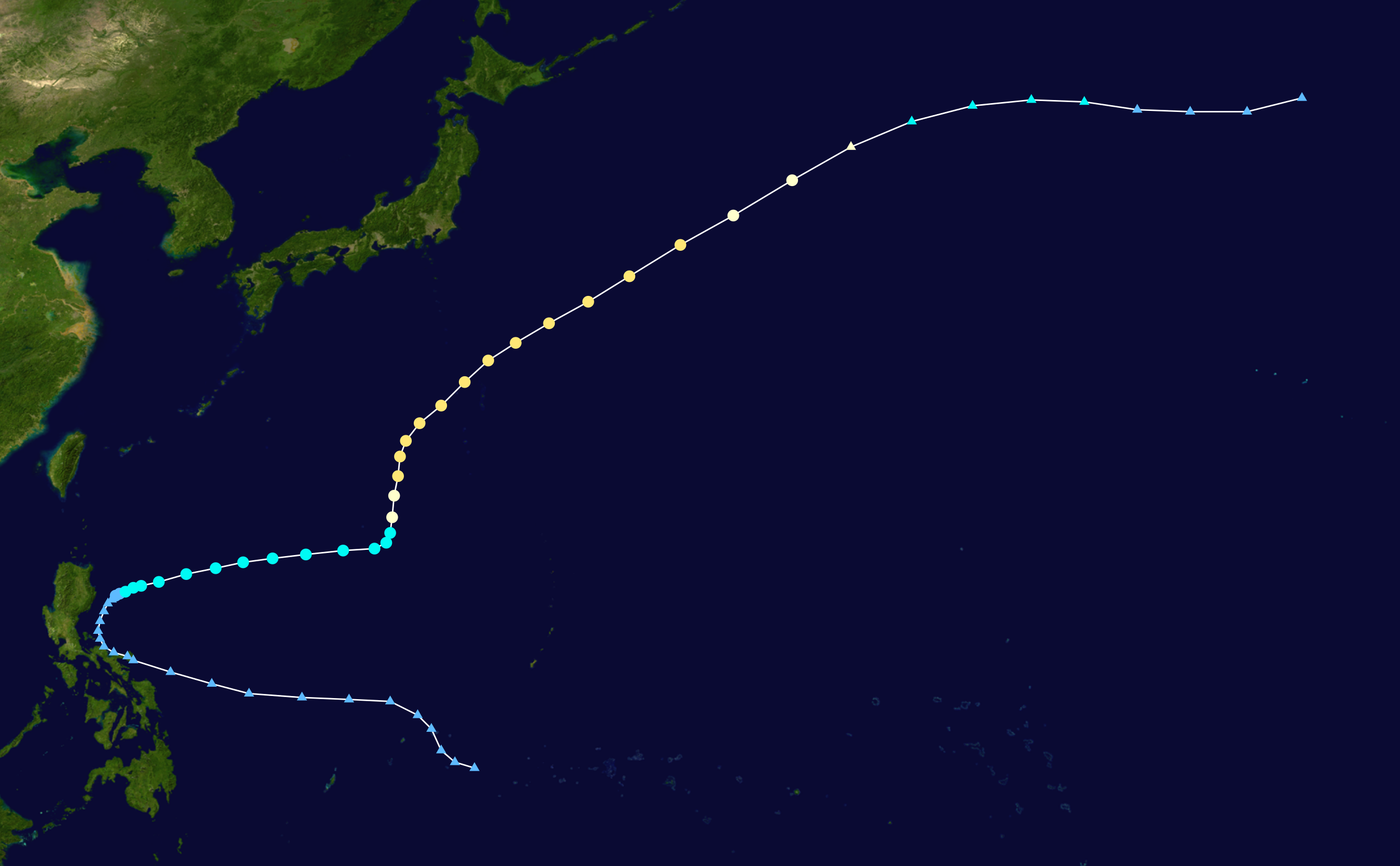
- Duration: September 14 – September 21
- Peak intensity: 140 km/h (85 mph) (10-min); 960 hPa (mbar)

Polly recurved out to sea.

=== Typhoon Ryan (Luding) ===
- Very strong typhoon (JMA)
- Category 4 super typhoon (SSHWS)
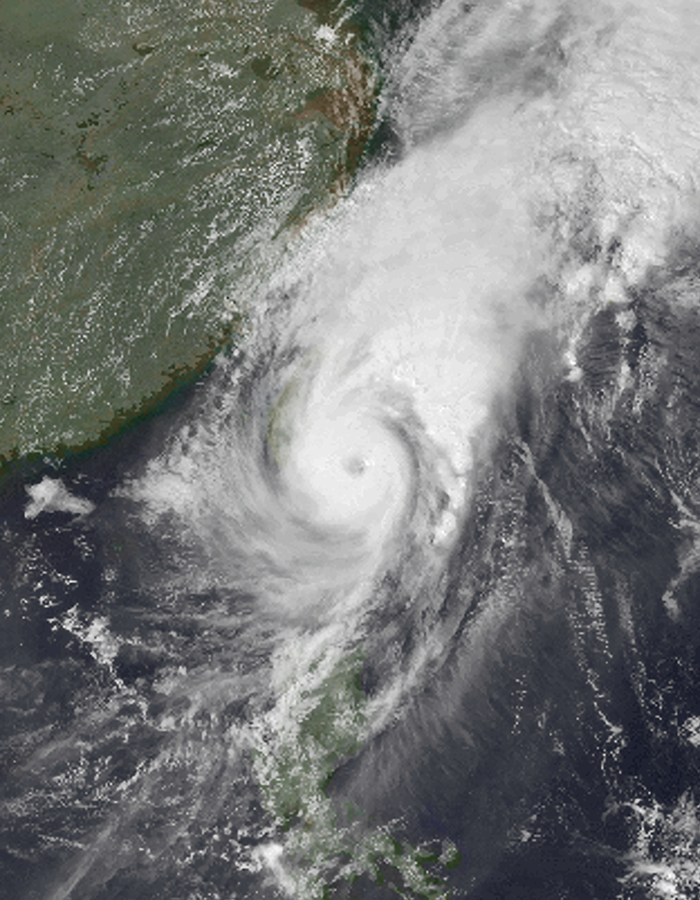
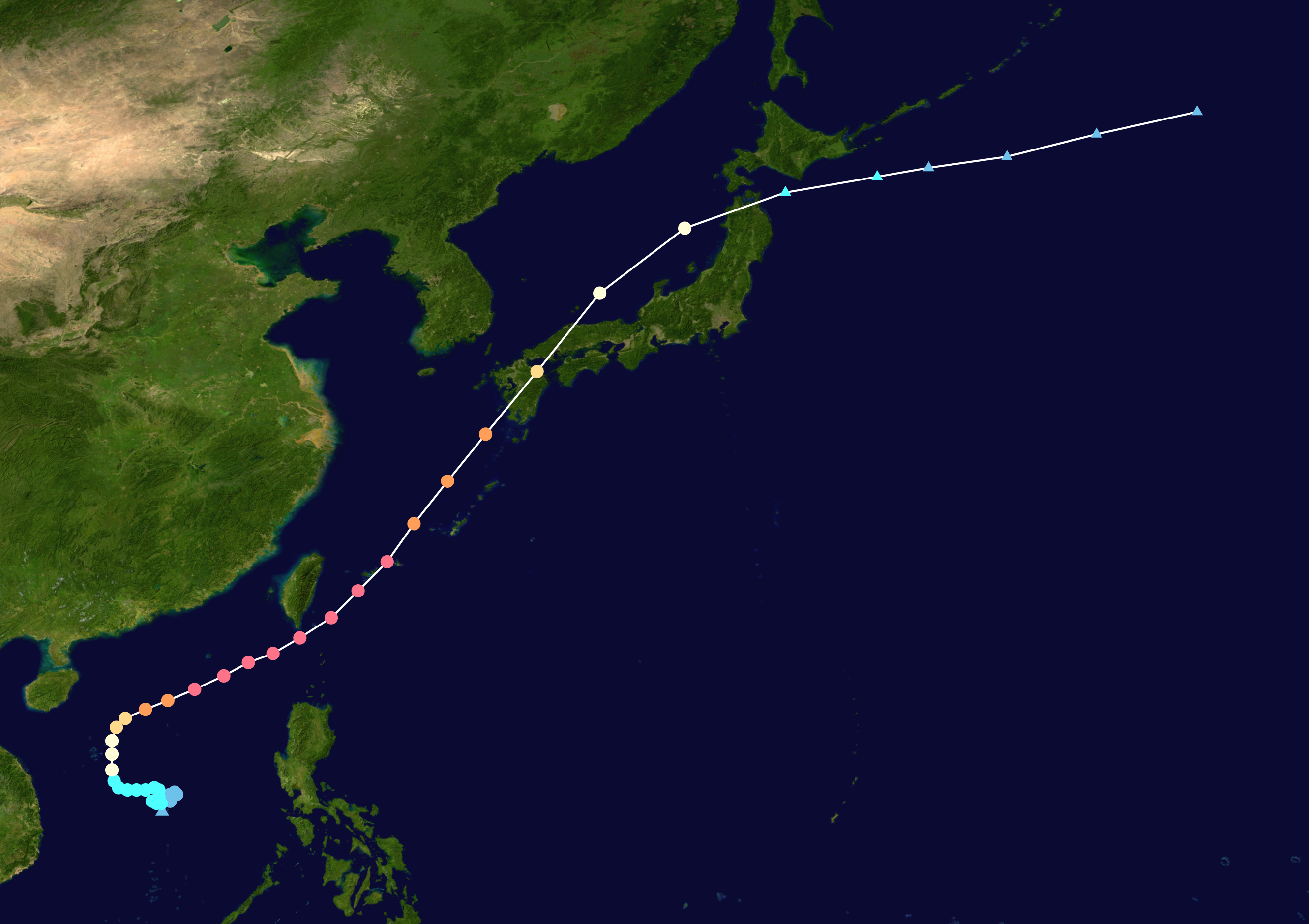
- Duration: September 15 – September 24
- Peak intensity: 155 km/h (100 mph) (10-min); 940 hPa (mbar)

The monsoon trough spawned a tropical depression over the South China Sea on September 14. It drifted northwestward, becoming a tropical storm on the 16th and a typhoon on the 19th. As Ryan turned northeastward, it rapidly intensified to become a super typhoon on the 21st at 155 mph, the first ever to form and reach that intensity in the South China Sea. The super typhoon passed south of Taiwan, and weakened to a 110 mph typhoon as it made landfall on southwestern Japan on the 23rd. Ryan caused 5 deaths on its path. Damage is Japan was very severe with losses totaling ¥35.4 billion (US$377 million).

=== Severe Tropical Storm Sibyl (Mameng) ===
- Severe tropical storm (JMA)
- Category 2 typhoon (SSHWS)
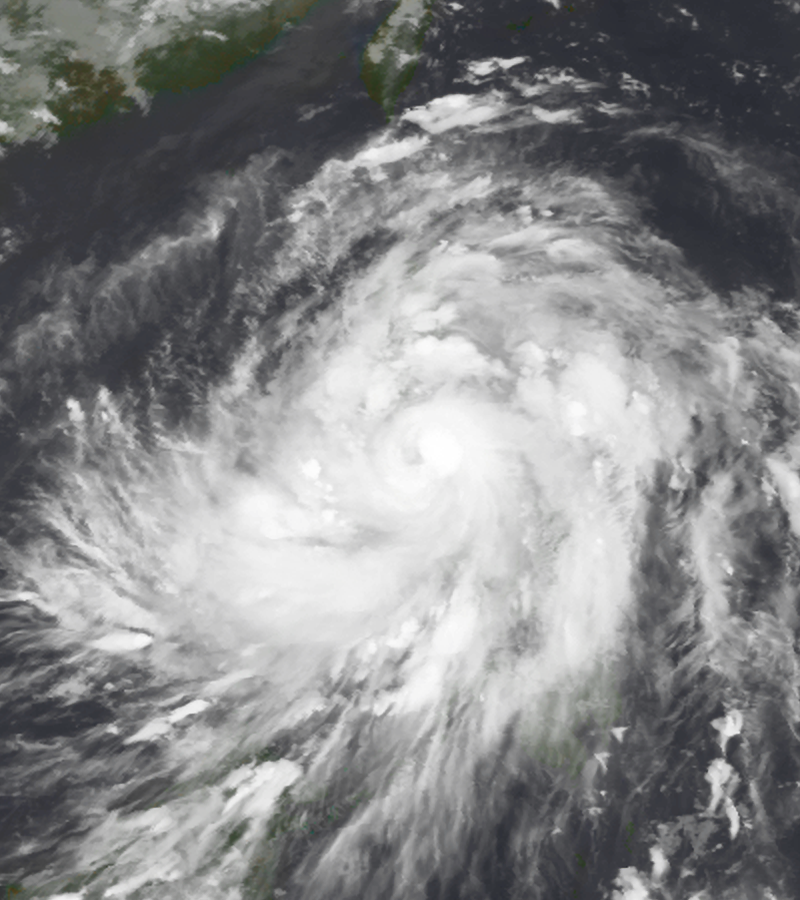
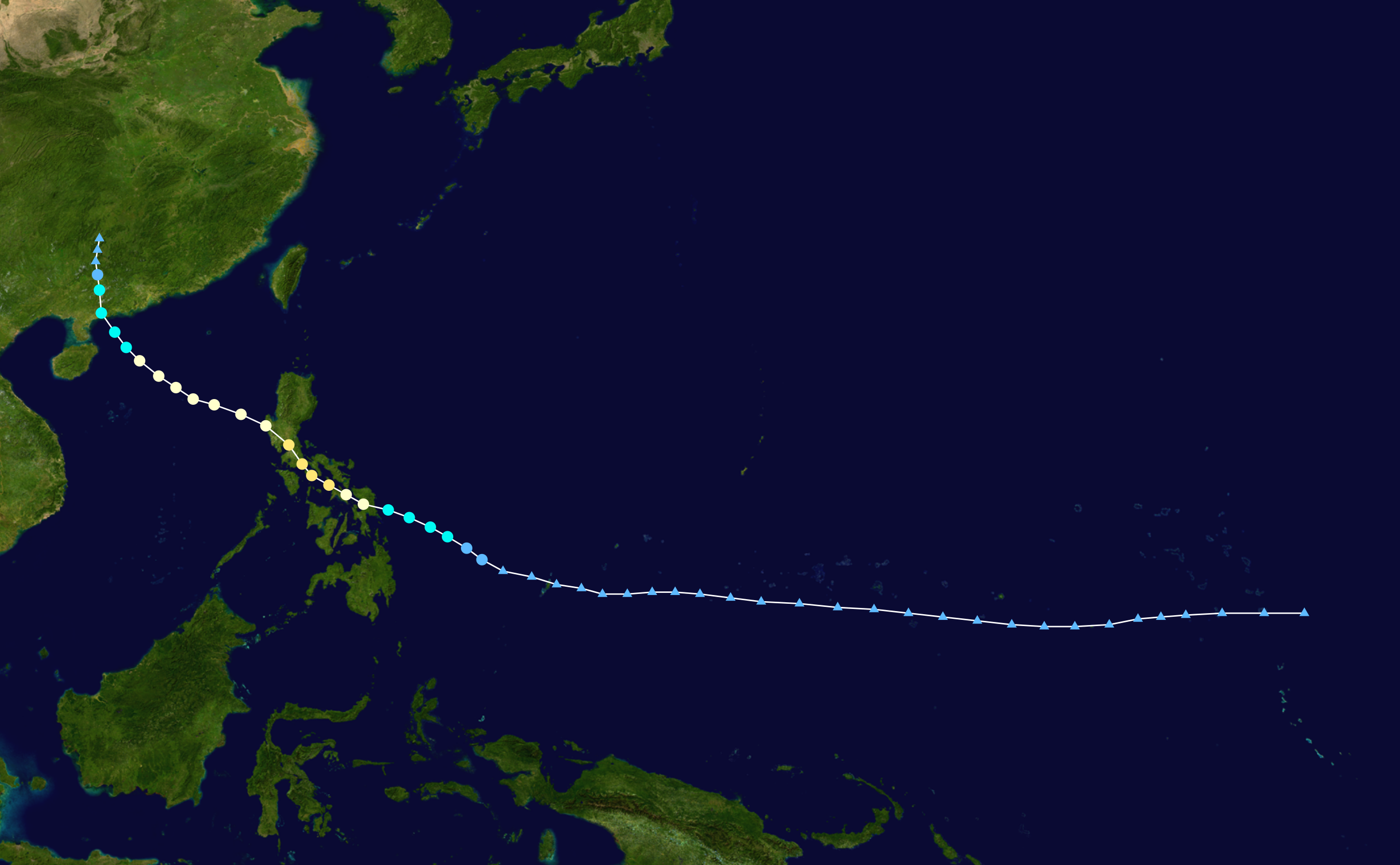
- Duration: September 27 – October 4
- Peak intensity: 95 km/h (60 mph) (10-min); 985 hPa (mbar)

108 fatalities and $38.5 million in damage (1995 USD) can be attributed to Tropical Storm Sibyl as it crossed the central Philippines on September 29. Sibyl actually strengthened while passing through the archipelago due to the contraction of the wind field.

=== Tropical Depression 21W ===
- Tropical depression (SSHWS)
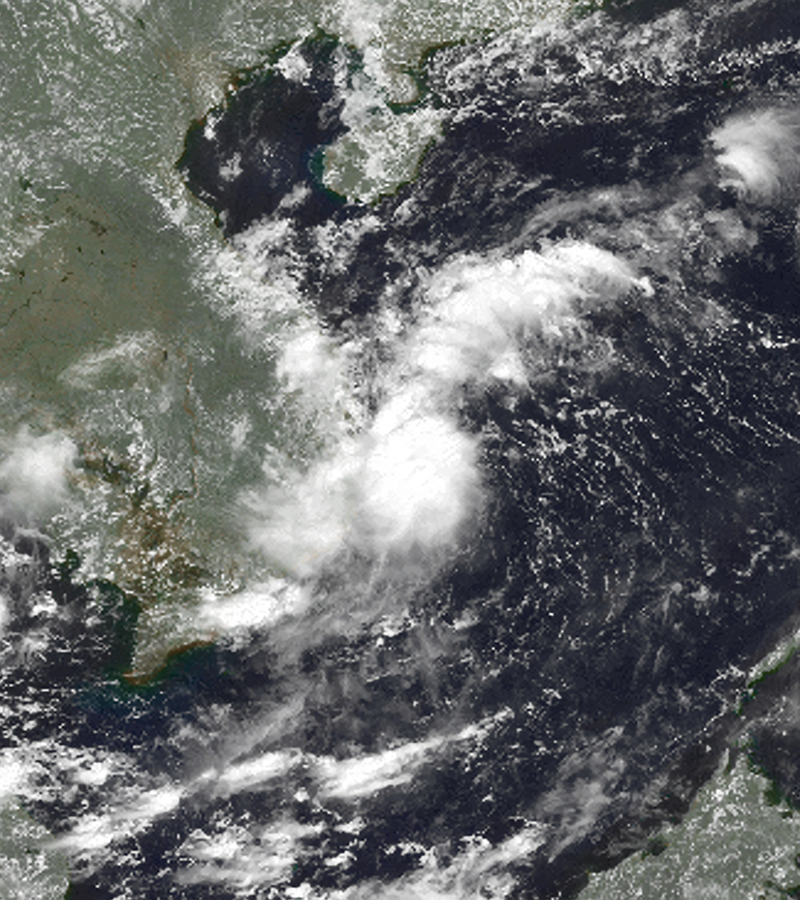
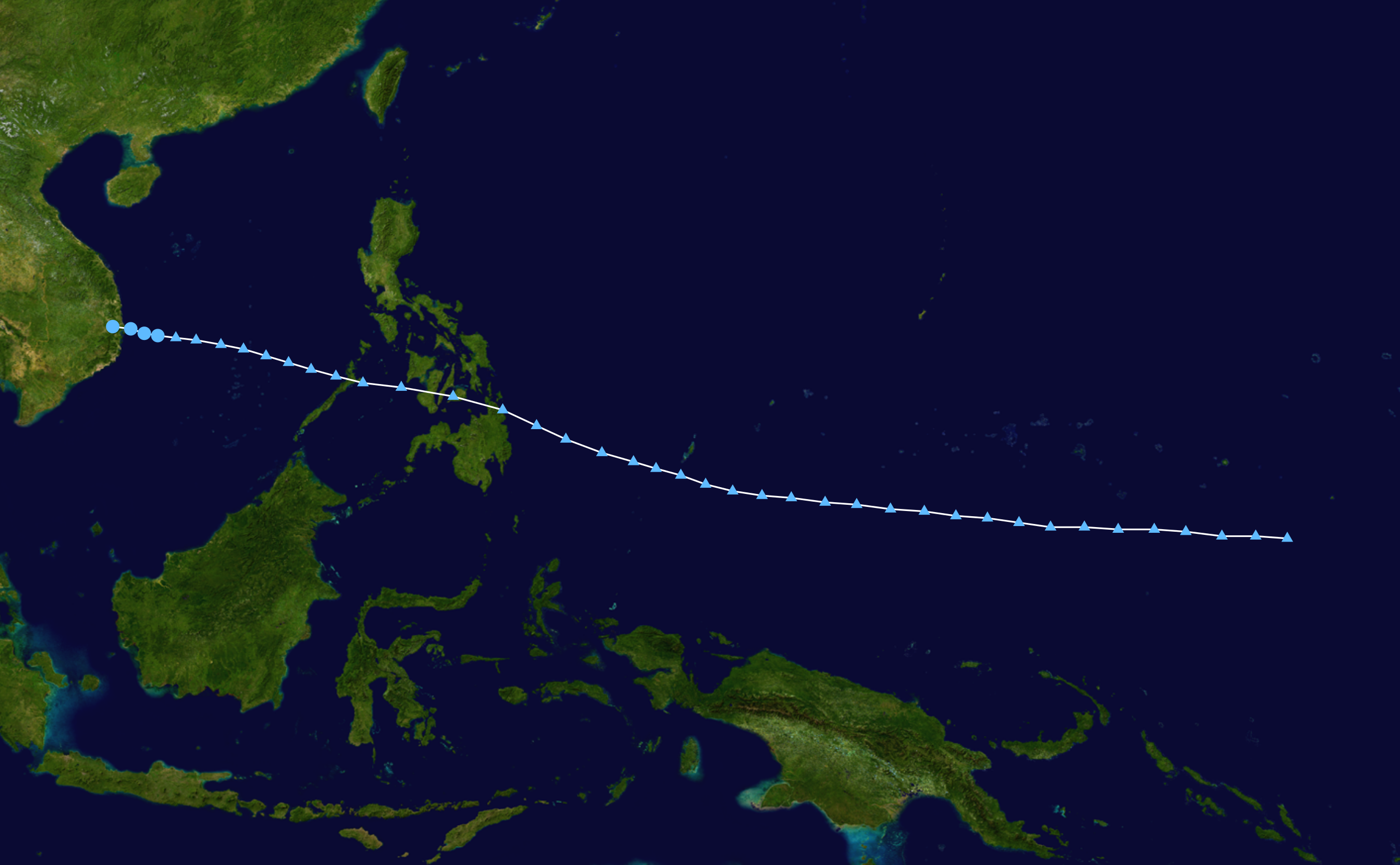
- Duration: September 28 – September 29
- Peak intensity: 45 km/h (30 mph) (1-min); 1006 hPa (mbar)

21W did not last long.

=== Tropical Depression 22W ===
- Tropical depression (SSHWS)
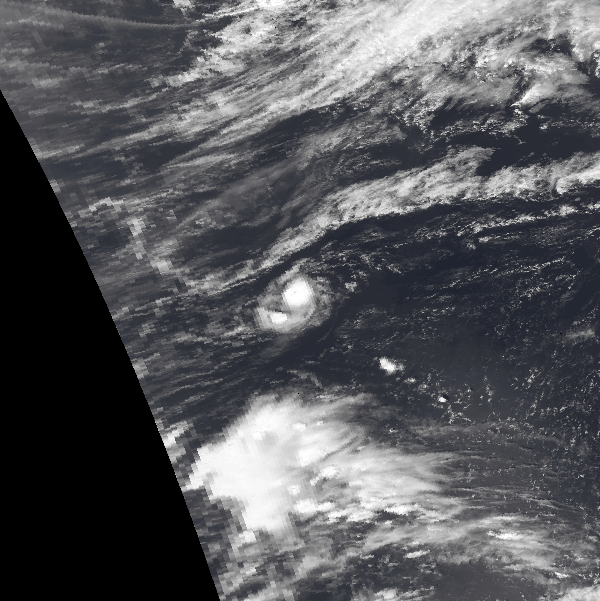
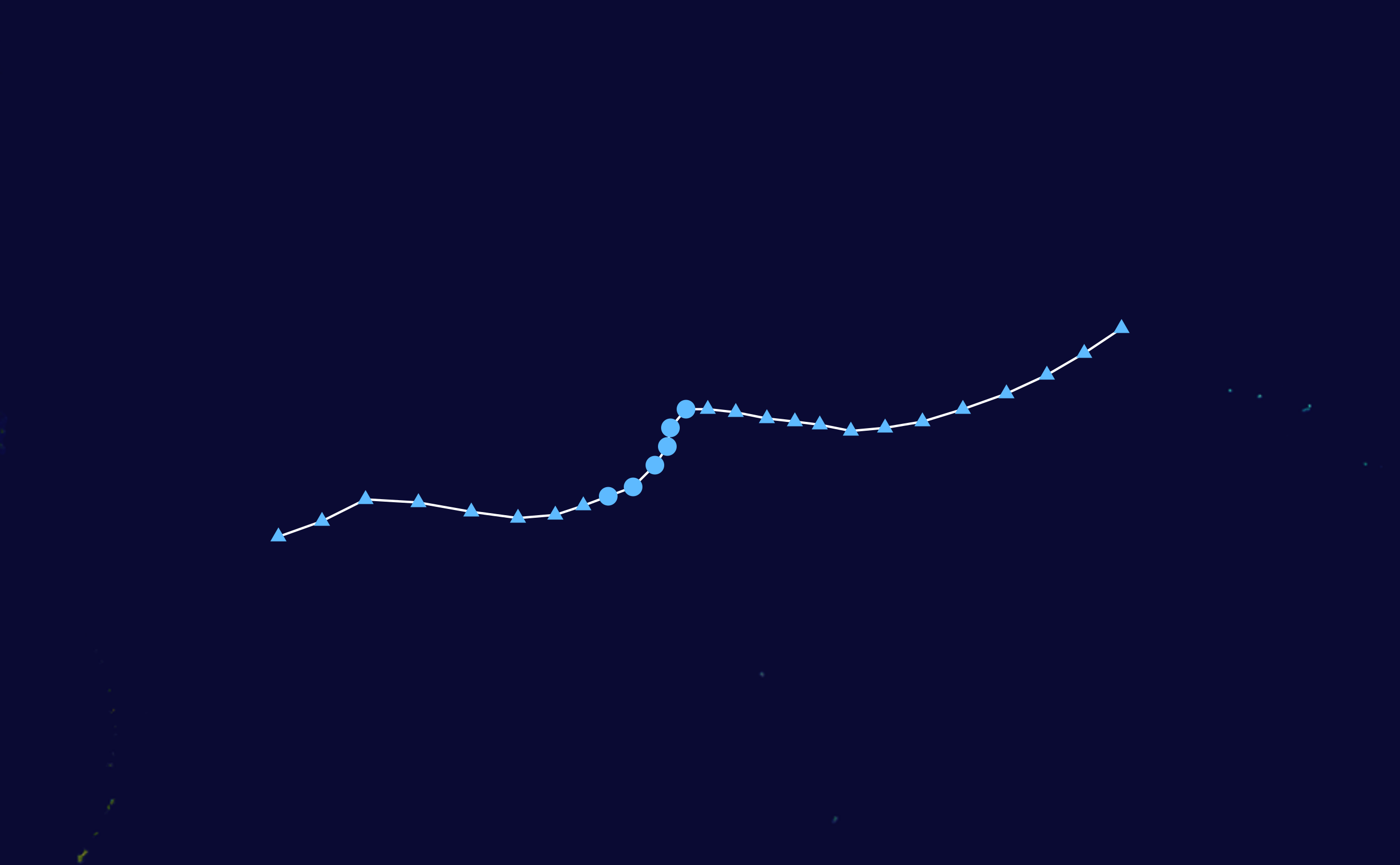
- Duration: September 30 – October 1
- Peak intensity: 55 km/h (35 mph) (1-min); 1016 hPa (mbar)

22W was only tracked by the JTWC.

=== Tropical Depression 23W ===
- Tropical depression (SSHWS)
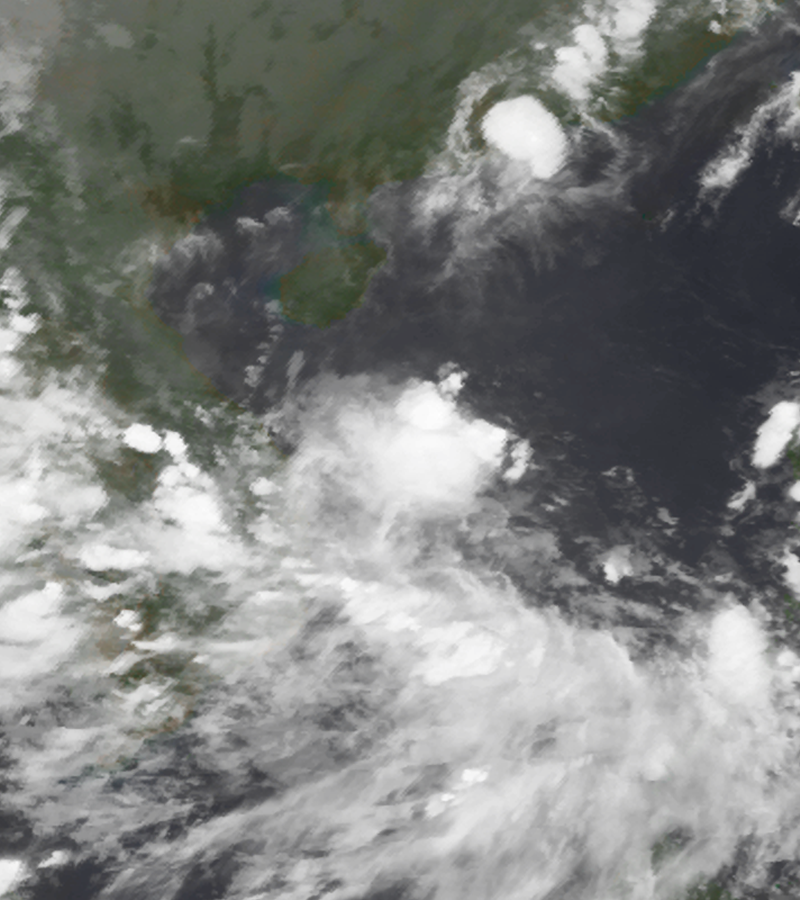
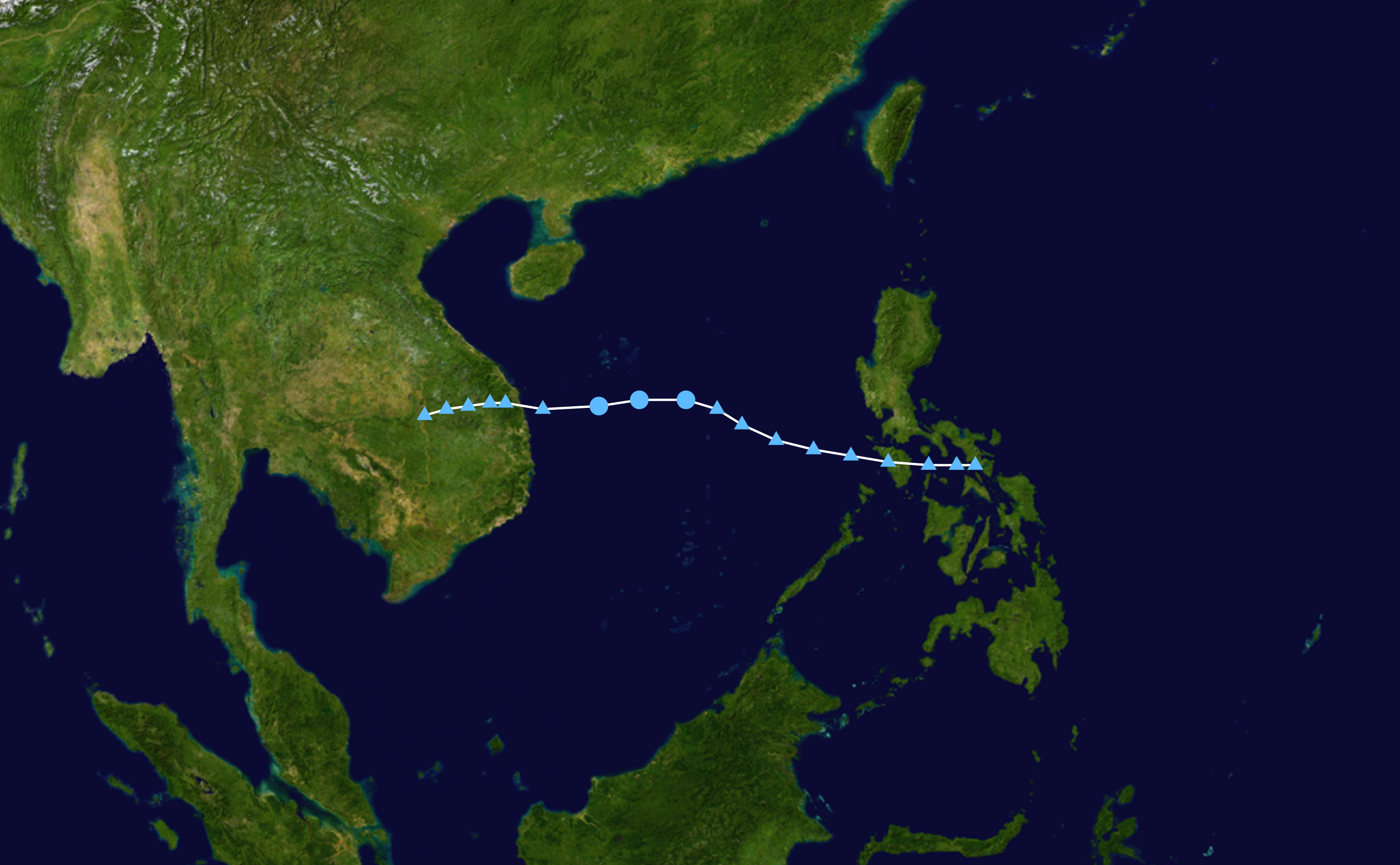
- Duration: October 5 – October 6
- Peak intensity: 45 km/h (30 mph) (1-min); 1004 hPa (mbar)

23W lasted a day.

=== Severe Tropical Storm Ted ===
- Severe tropical storm (JMA)
- Category 1 typhoon (SSHWS)
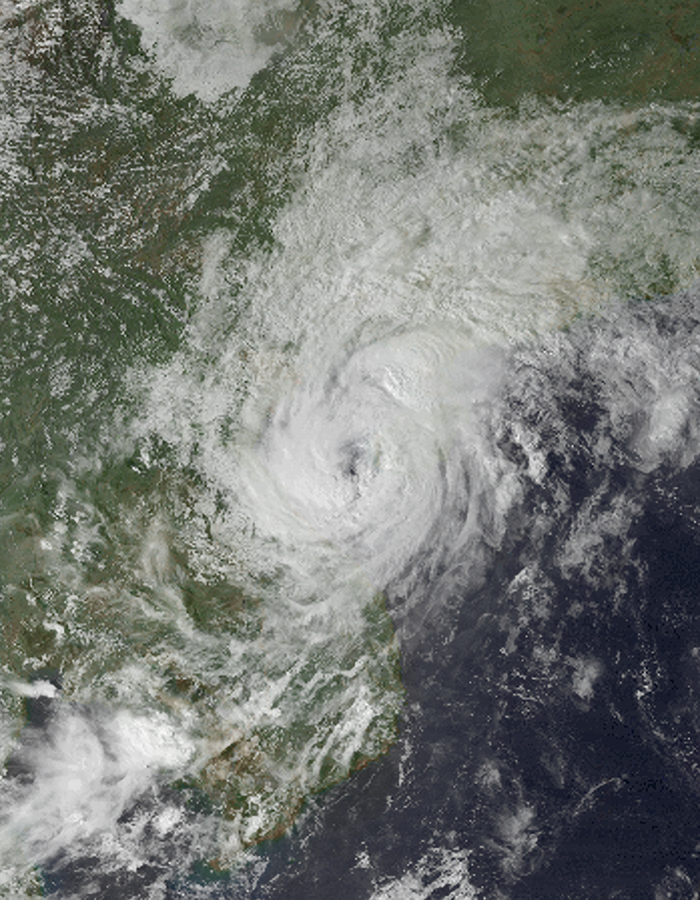
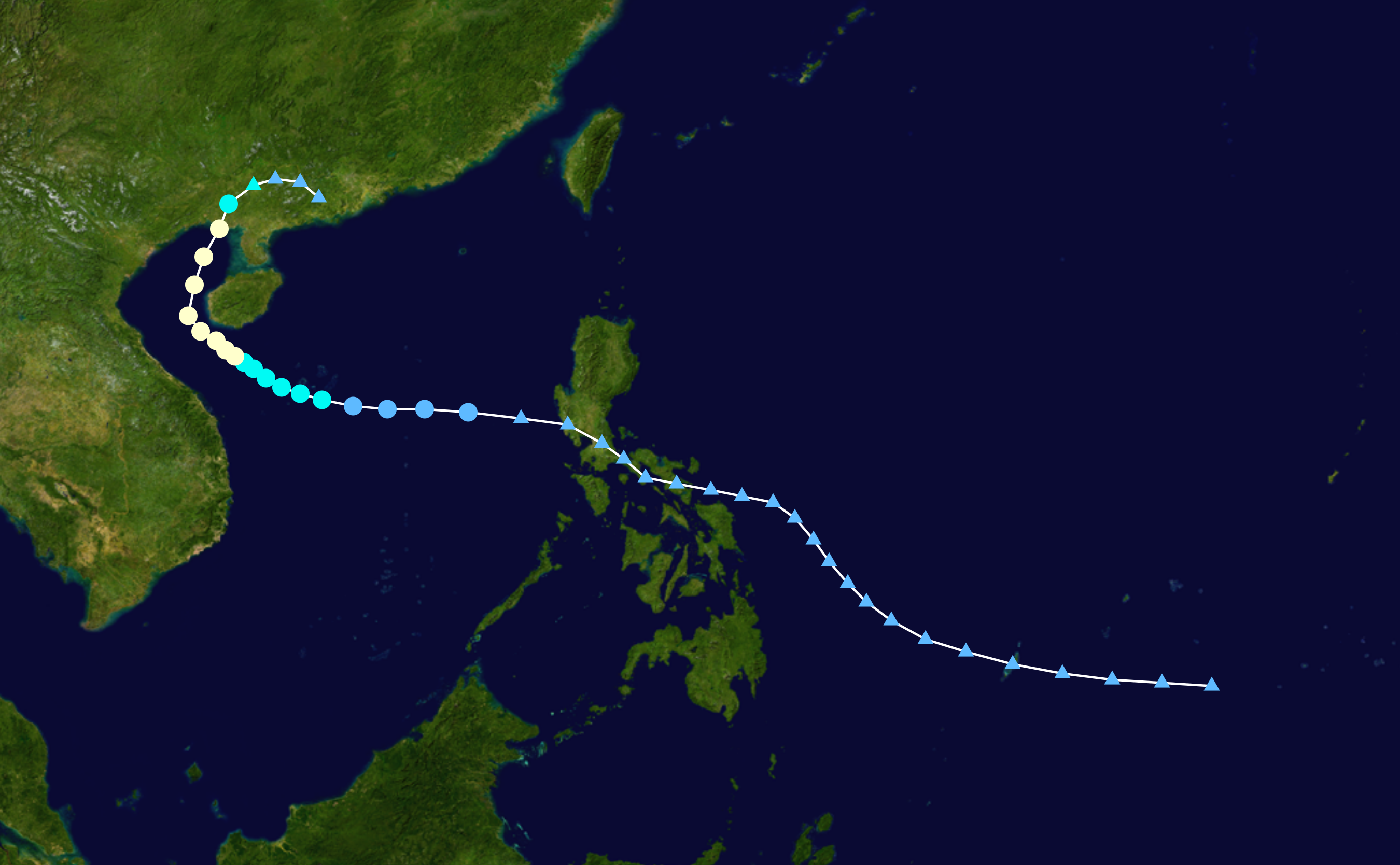
- Duration: October 7 – October 14
- Peak intensity: 95 km/h (60 mph) (10-min); 990 hPa (mbar)

Ted hit China. 61 people were killed and economic losses were 3.6 billion RMB (US$433 million).

=== Tropical Storm Val ===
- Tropical storm (JMA)
- Tropical storm (SSHWS)
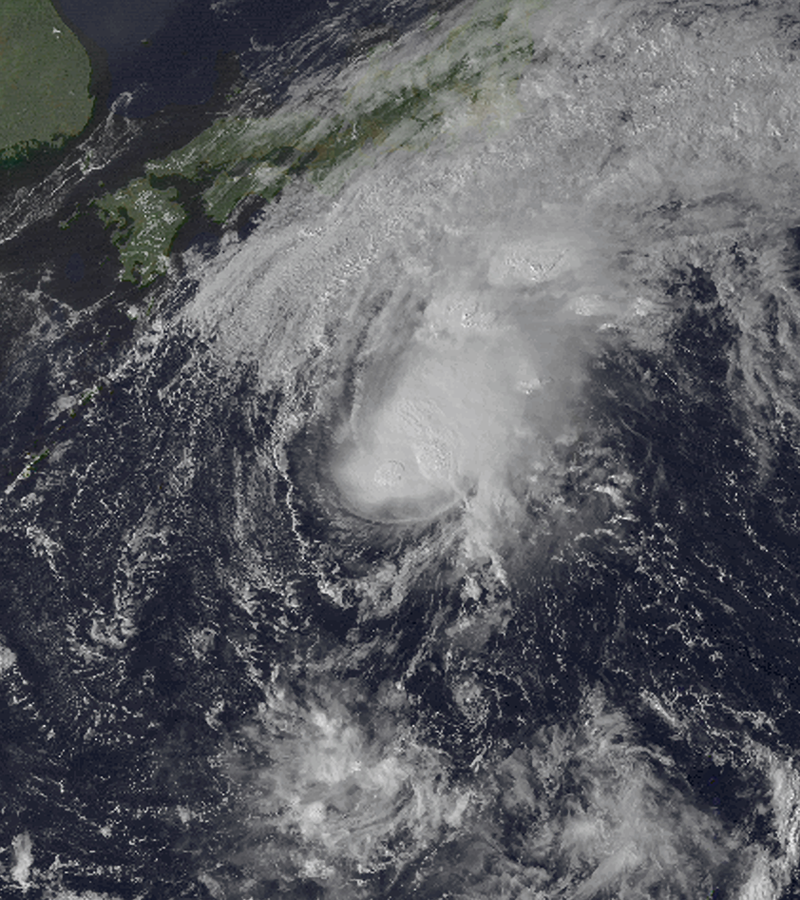
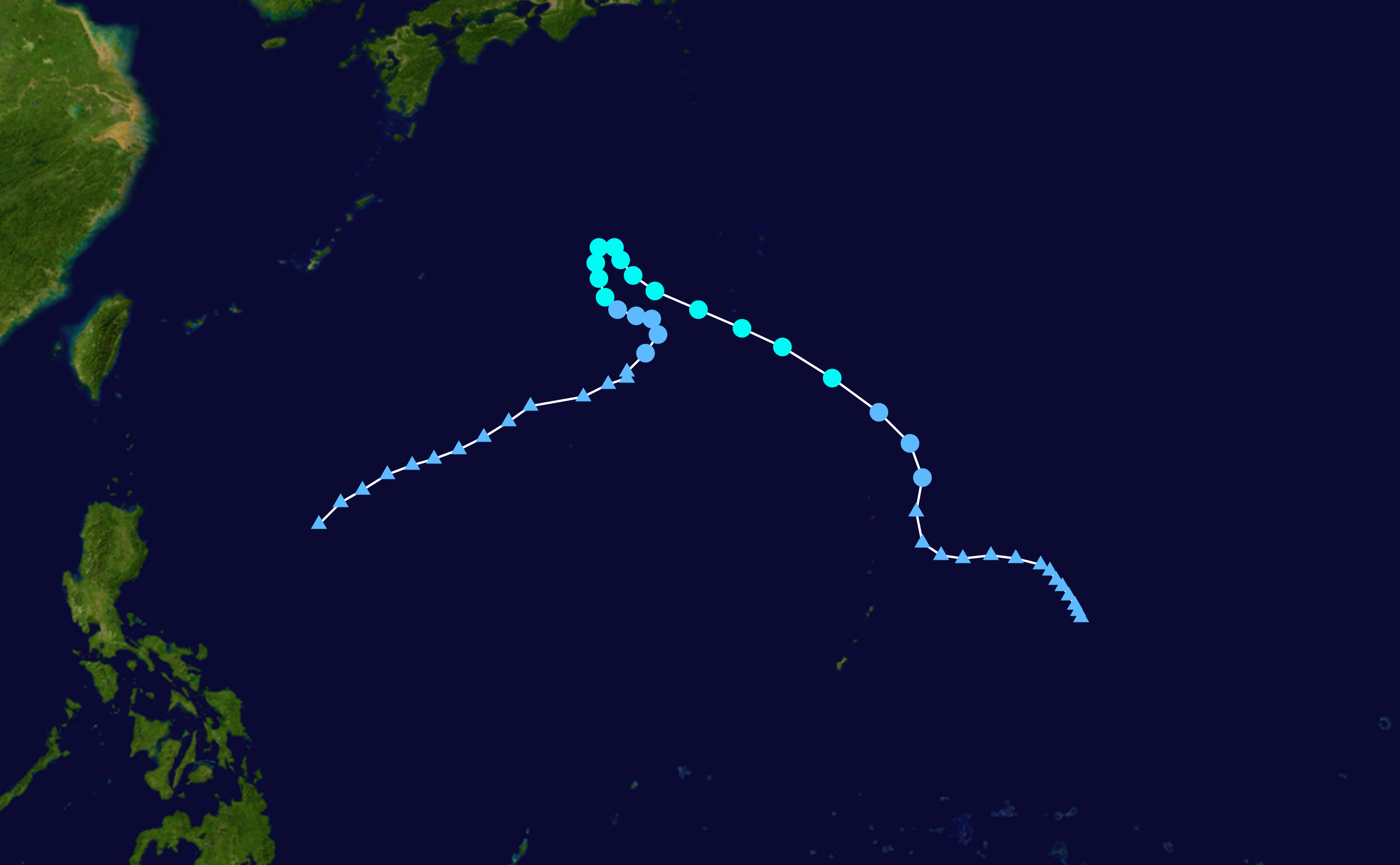
- Duration: October 8 – October 14
- Peak intensity: 75 km/h (45 mph) (10-min); 996 hPa (mbar)

Val moved erratically over open water.

=== Typhoon Ward (Neneng) ===
- Very strong typhoon (JMA)
- Category 5 super typhoon (SSHWS)
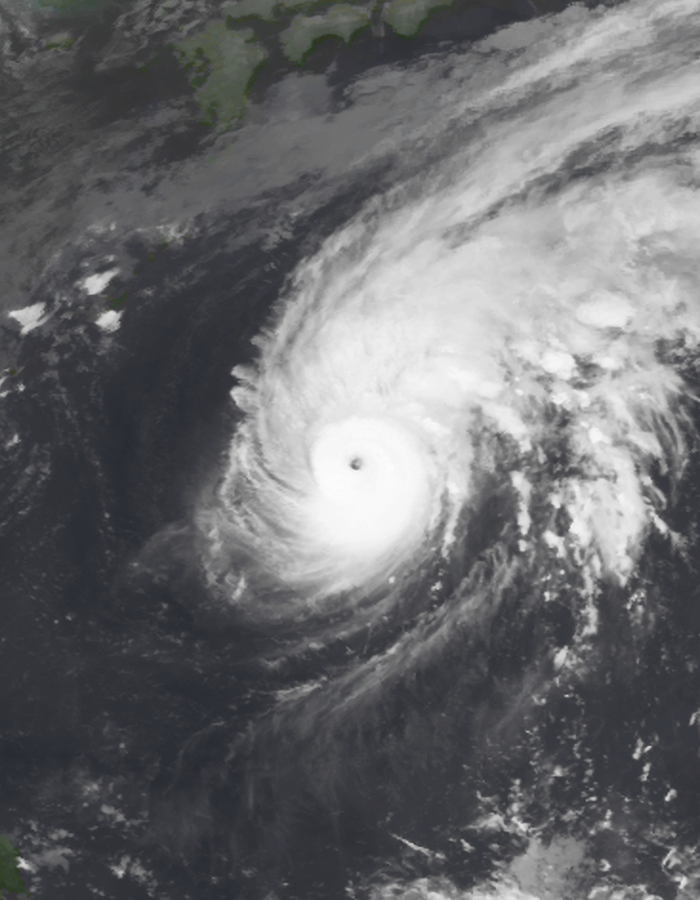
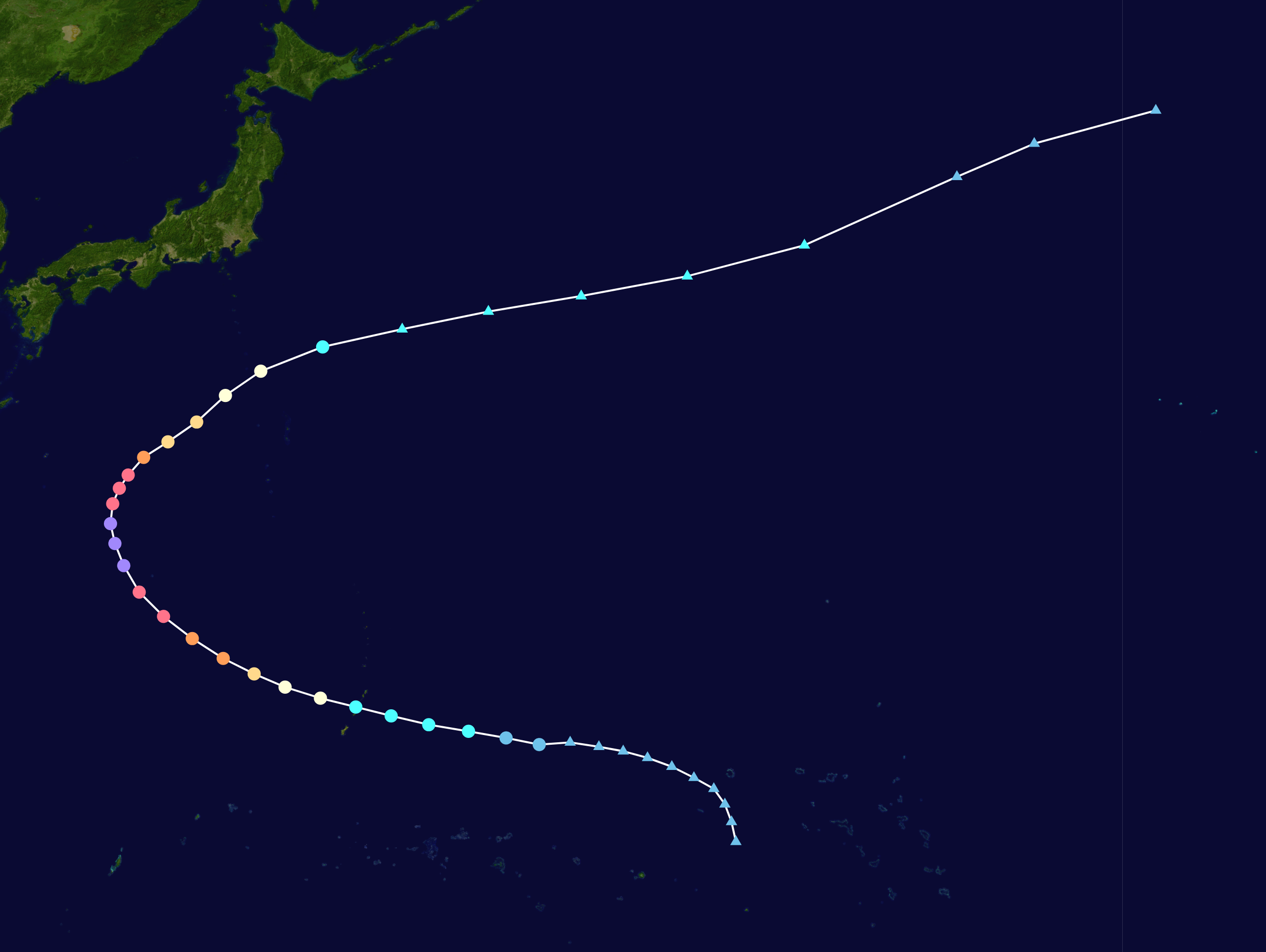
- Duration: October 16 – October 22
- Peak intensity: 155 km/h (100 mph) (10-min); 940 hPa (mbar)

Ward recurved out to sea.

=== Severe Tropical Storm Yvette (Oniang) ===
- Severe tropical storm (JMA)
- Category 1 typhoon (SSHWS)
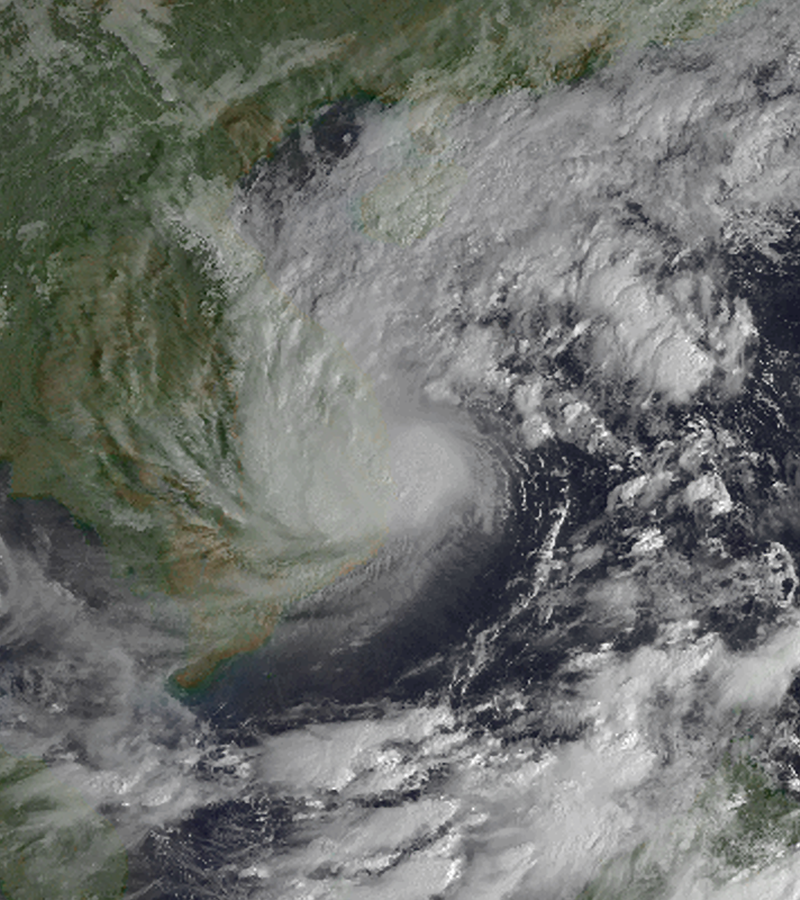
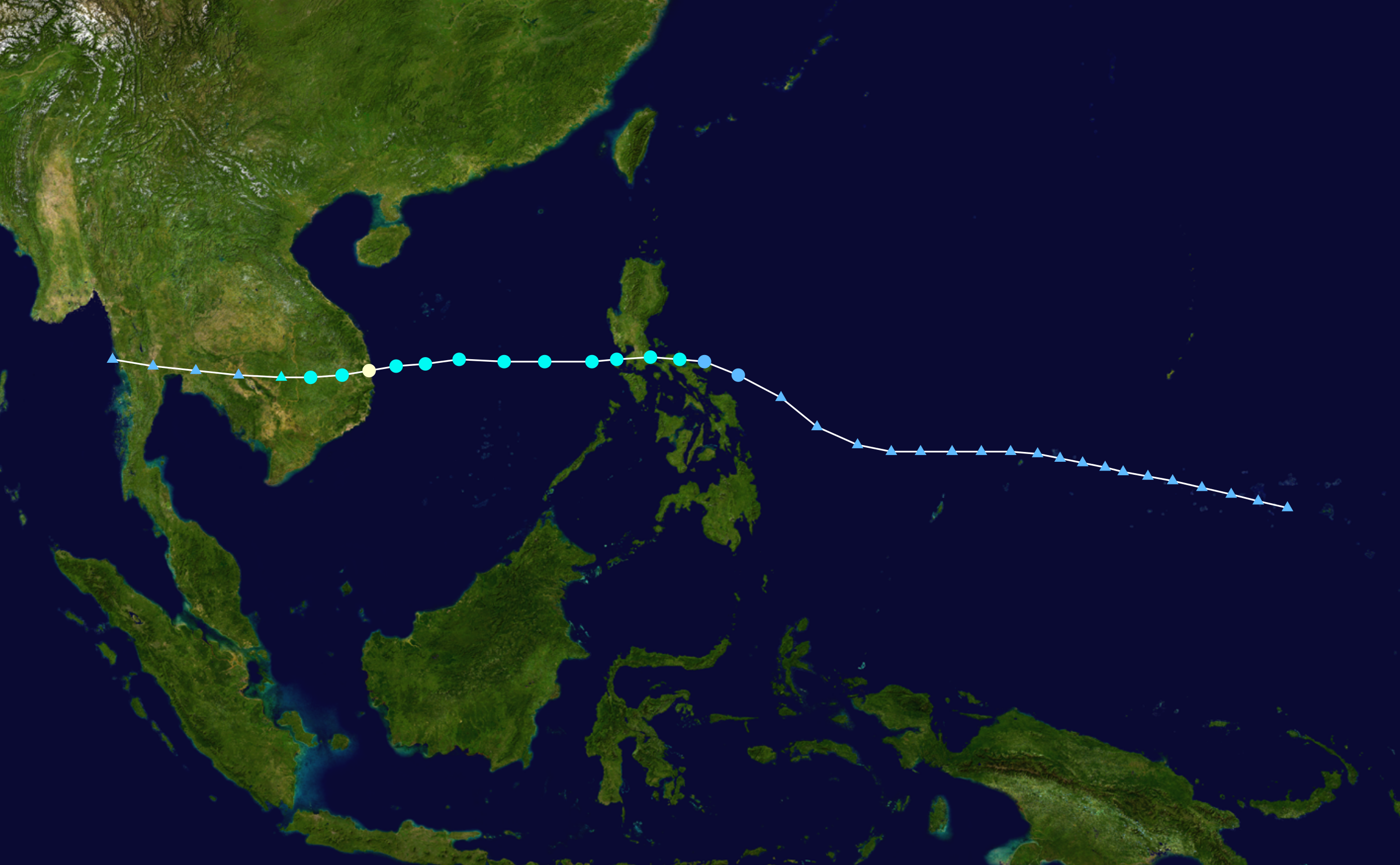
- Duration: October 23 – October 27
- Peak intensity: 95 km/h (60 mph) (10-min); 985 hPa (mbar)

Yvette hit Vietnam as a severe tropical storm.

=== Typhoon Zack (Pepang) ===
- Very strong typhoon (JMA)
- Category 4 typhoon (SSHWS)
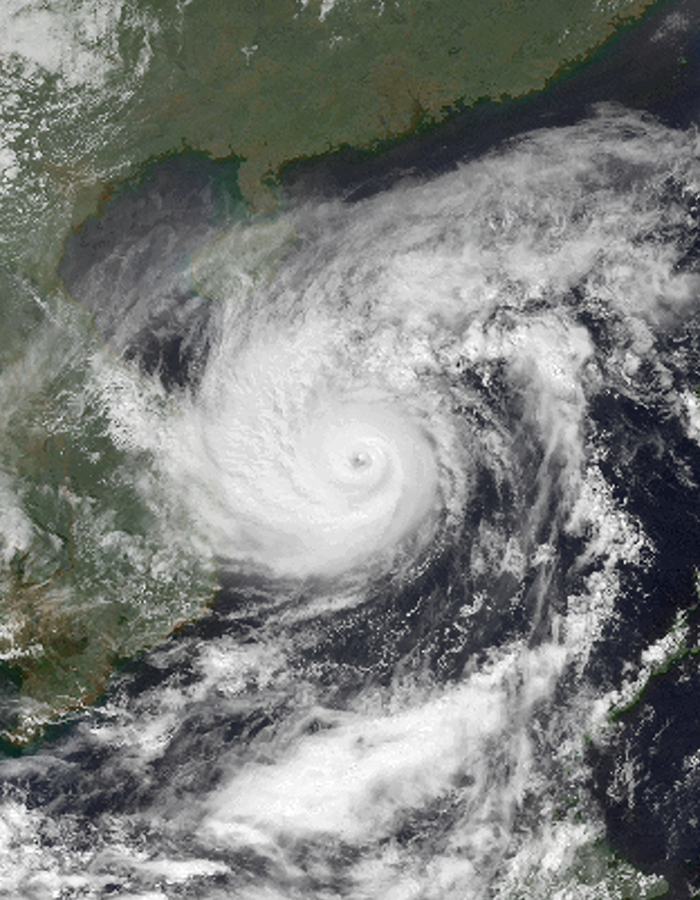
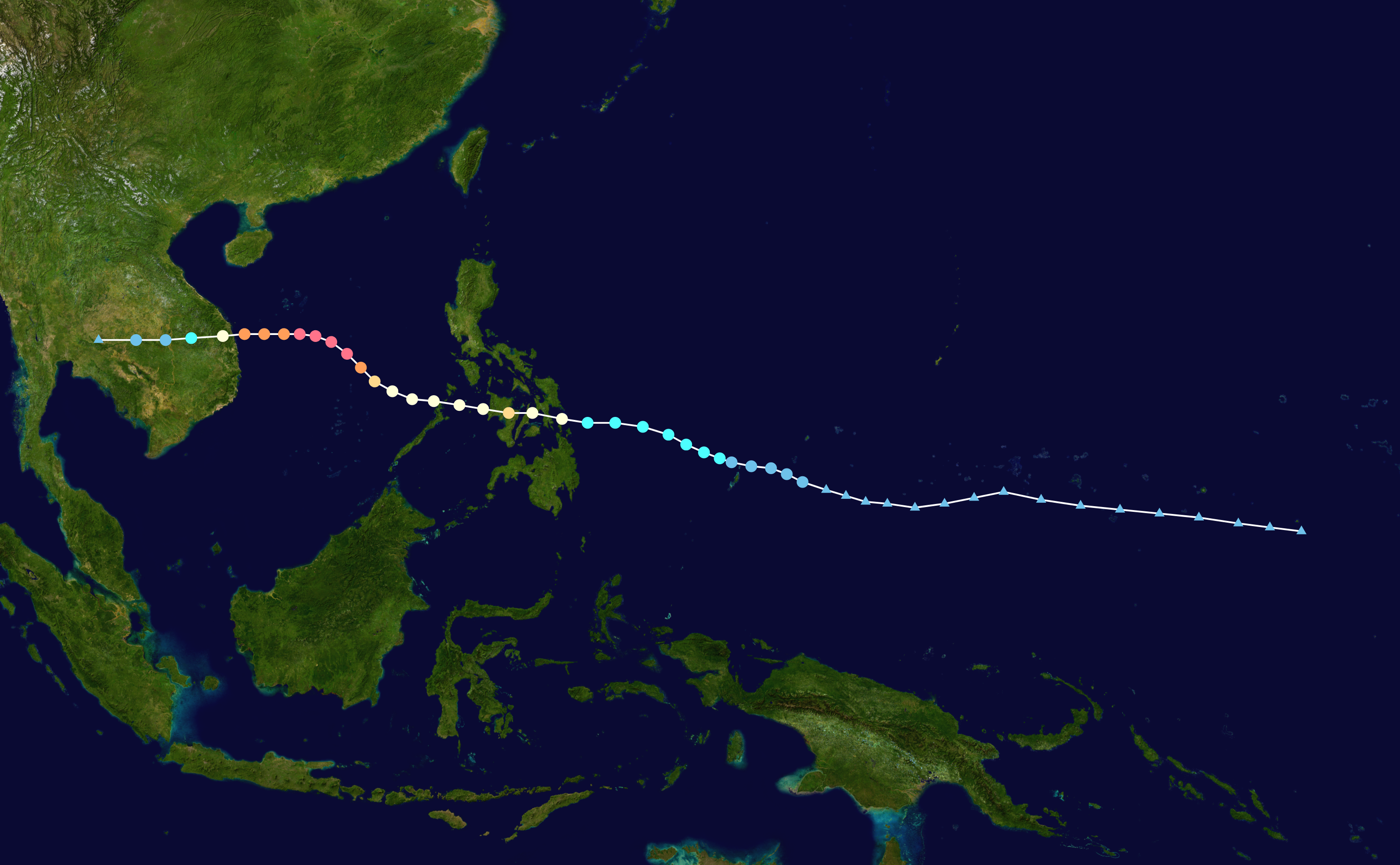
- Duration: October 24 – November 2
- Peak intensity: 165 km/h (105 mph) (10-min); 950 hPa (mbar)

Like Sibyl, Zack strengthened while crossing the central Philippines on October 28. The typhoon continued to intensify over the South China Sea to a 140 mph storm, but weakened to a 115 mph typhoon as it made landfall on eastern Vietnam on the 1st.

The number of casualties from Typhoon Zack in the Philippines varies among reports. The JTWC report claims there were 110 deaths in the Philippines, including 72 in Negros Occidental, 18 in Cebu, and 20 in Iloilo. On the other hand, the HKO report states that the death toll in the country was over 160.

Regarding the strong winds caused by Typhoon Zack in Vietnam, the recorded wind gust speeds in Quảng Ngãi and Da Nang were both 144 km/h (89 mph). The lowest atmospheric pressure values during the typhoon, measured at several locations near the landfall area such as Quảng Ngãi and Quy Nhơn, were all above 995 hPa (29.38 inHg). In Da Nang, the rainfall caused by Typhoon Zack reached 430 mm. The typhoon has killed 27 people in Vietnam.

=== Typhoon Angela (Rosing) ===
- Violent typhoon (JMA)
- Category 5 super typhoon (SSHWS)
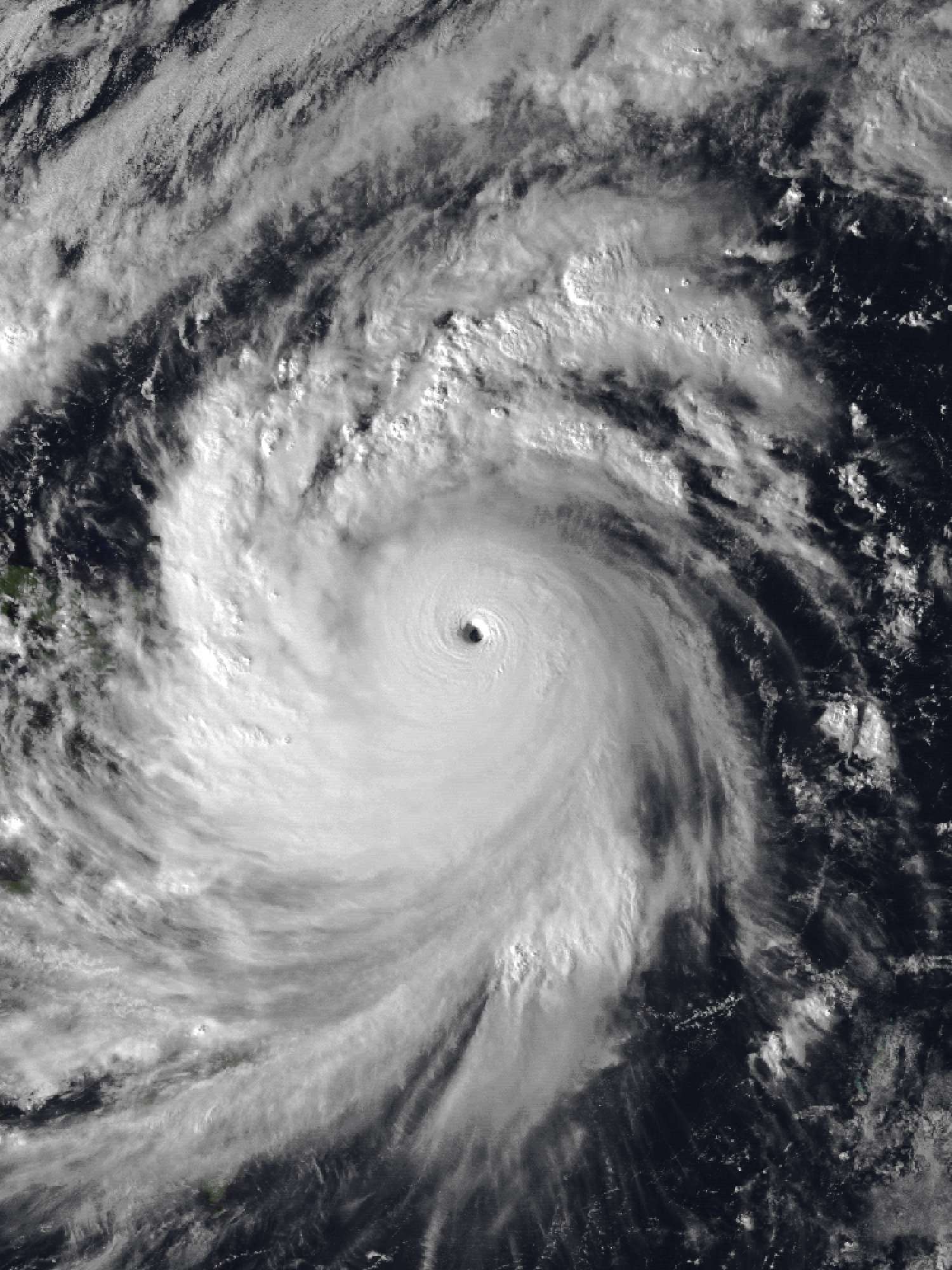
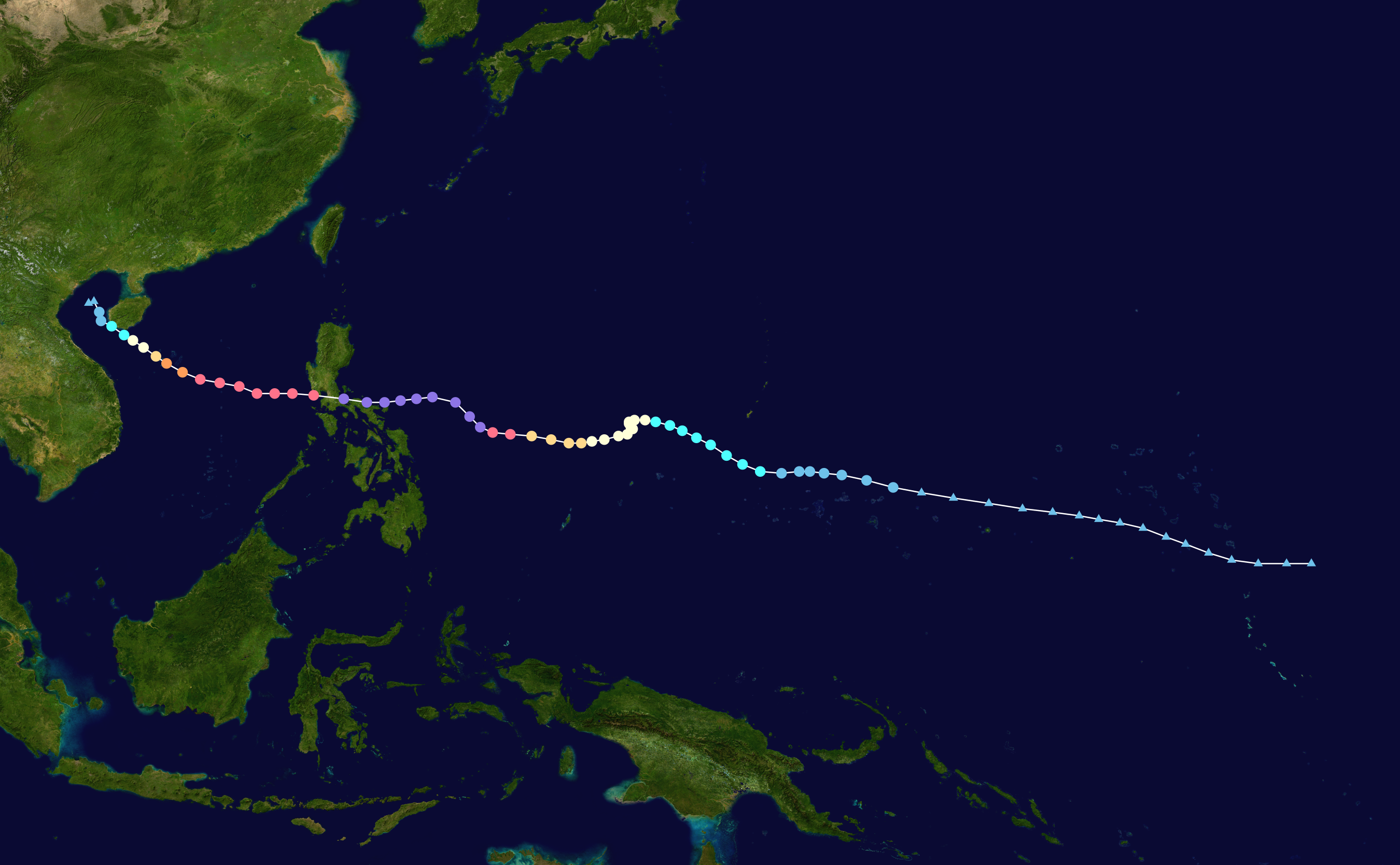
- Duration: October 25 – November 7
- Peak intensity: 215 km/h (130 mph) (10-min); 910 hPa (mbar)

The monsoon trough that developed Yvette and Zack spawned another tropical depression on October 25. It moved to the west, organizing very slowly to become a tropical storm on the 26th. 2 days later Angela became a typhoon, and from the 31st to the 1st Angela rapidly intensified to a 180 mph (290 km/h) super typhoon. It maintained that intensity as it moved westward, hitting the Philippines on the 2nd as a slightly weaker 160 mph (260 km/h) storm. Angela continued to the west-northwest, where upper-level winds caused it to dissipate on the 7th over the Gulf of Tonkin. Angela caused 9.33 billion Philippine Pesos (1995 pesos) in damage across the Philippines, resulting in 882 fatalities.

=== Tropical Storm Brian ===
- Tropical storm (JMA)
- Tropical storm (SSHWS)
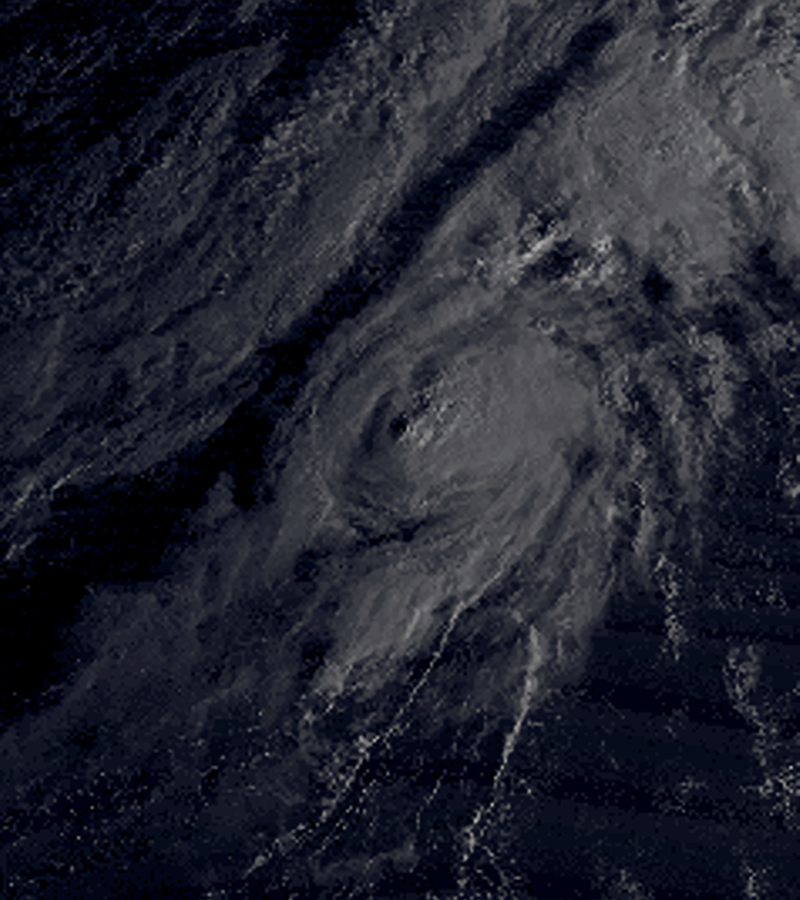
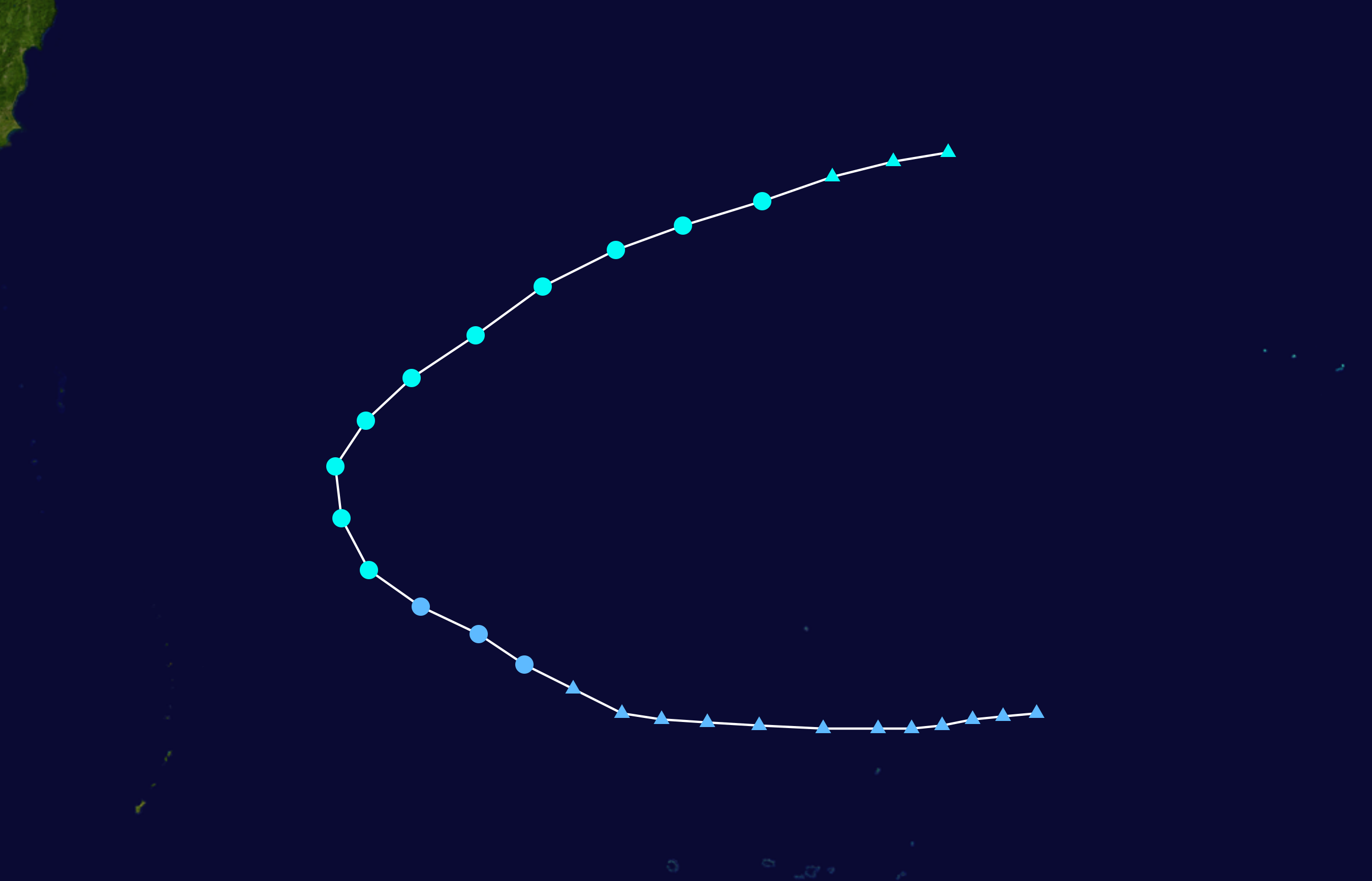
- Duration: November 1 – November 3
- Peak intensity: 75 km/h (45 mph) (10-min); 998 hPa (mbar)

Brian stayed away from land.

=== Tropical Storm Colleen ===
- Tropical depression (JMA)
- Tropical storm (SSHWS)
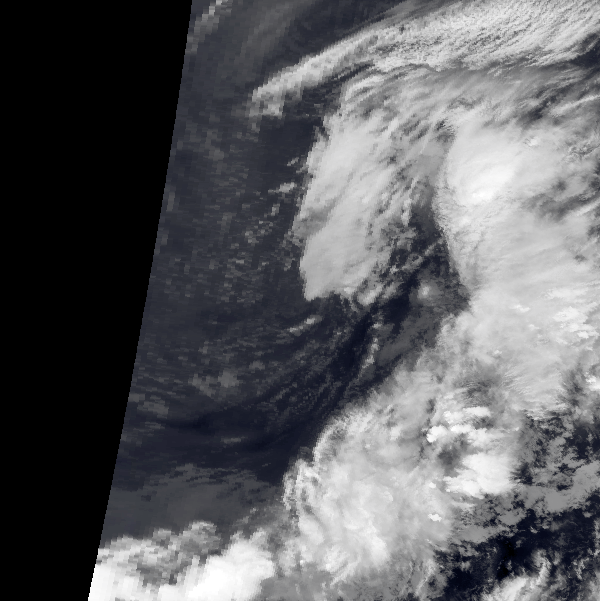
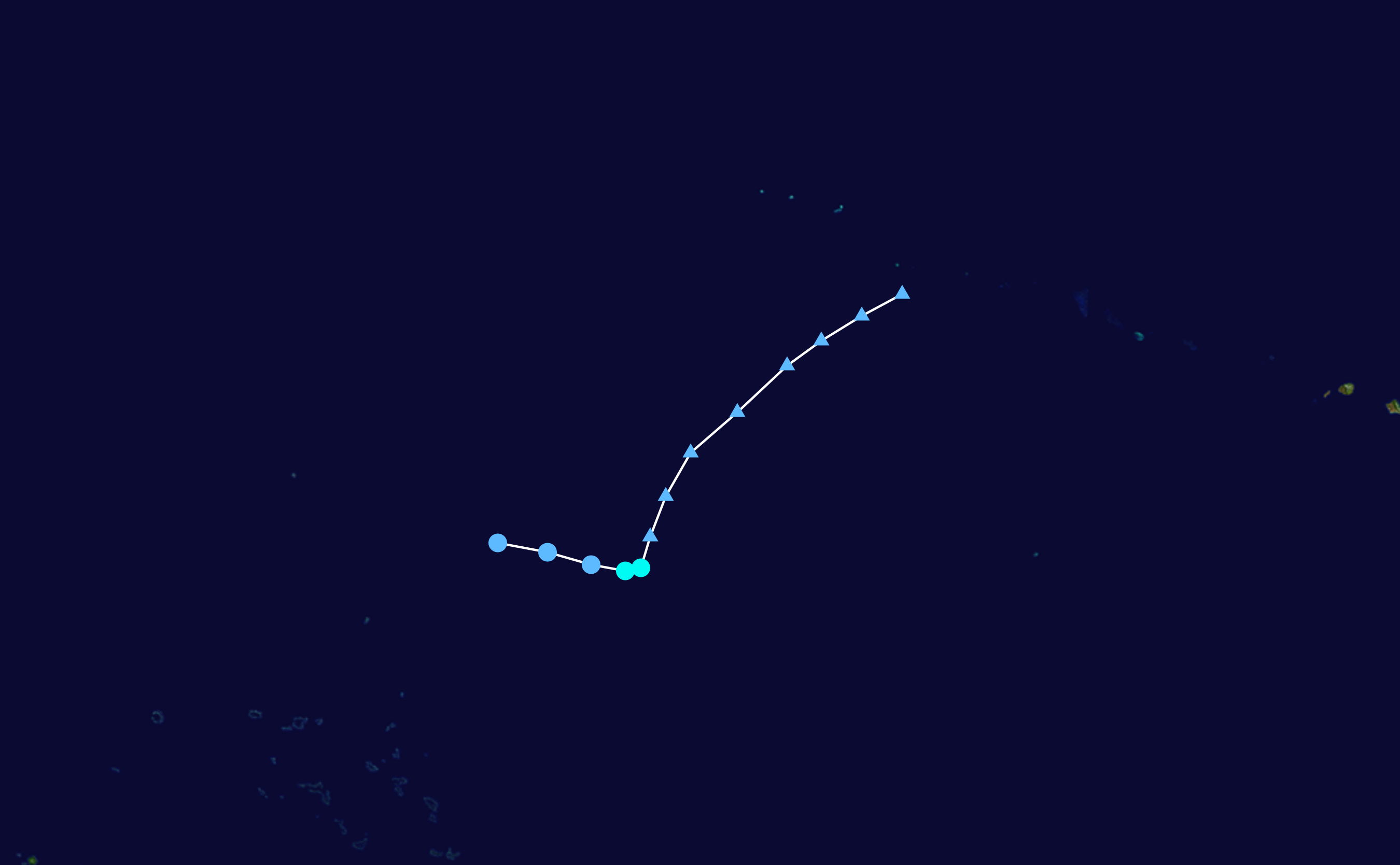
- Duration: November 11 (entered basin) – November 12
- Peak intensity: 55 km/h (35 mph) (10-min); 1004 hPa (mbar)

A non-tropical low area developed well far to the northwest of Hawaii on November 9. The low pressure area began slowly acquiring subtropical characteristics as it moved southwest before crossing the International Date line on November 11, as the JTWC issued a TCFA later on the same day. Early on the 12th the JTWC began advisories on Tropical Storm Colleen as the low pressure area acquired enough tropical characteristics, Not long after being designated, Colleen then moved westward as strong wind shear disheveled the small storm, causing it to dissipate on November 13.

The Japanese Meteorological Agency did not track Colleen as a tropical storm.

=== Tropical Depression 32W/33W (Sendang) ===
- Tropical depression (PAGASA)
- Tropical depression (SSHWS)
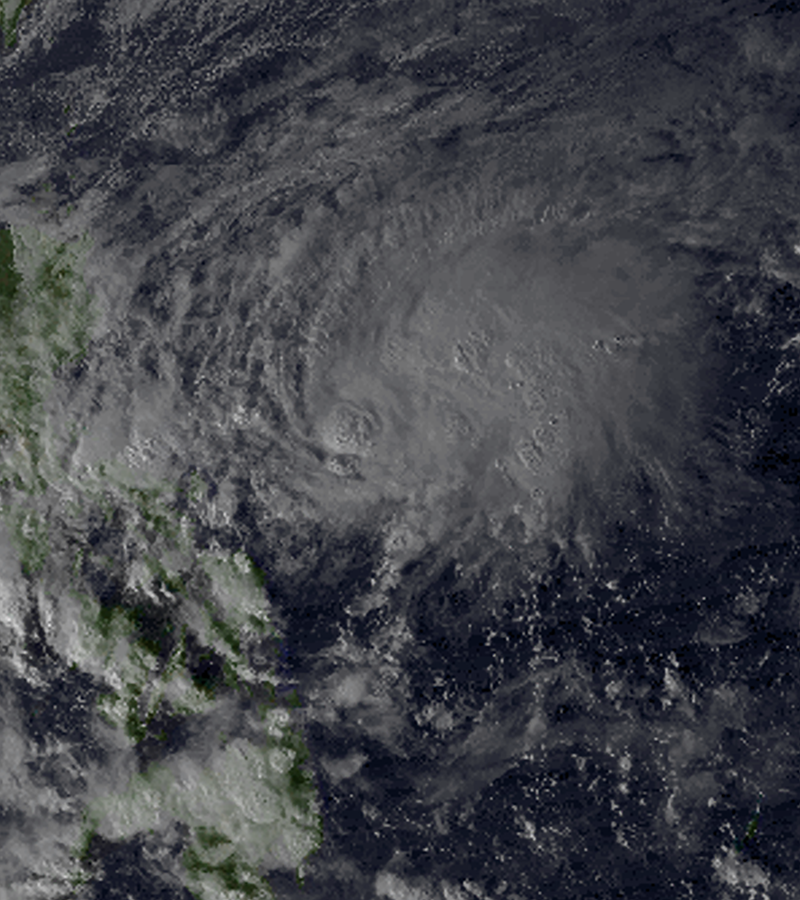
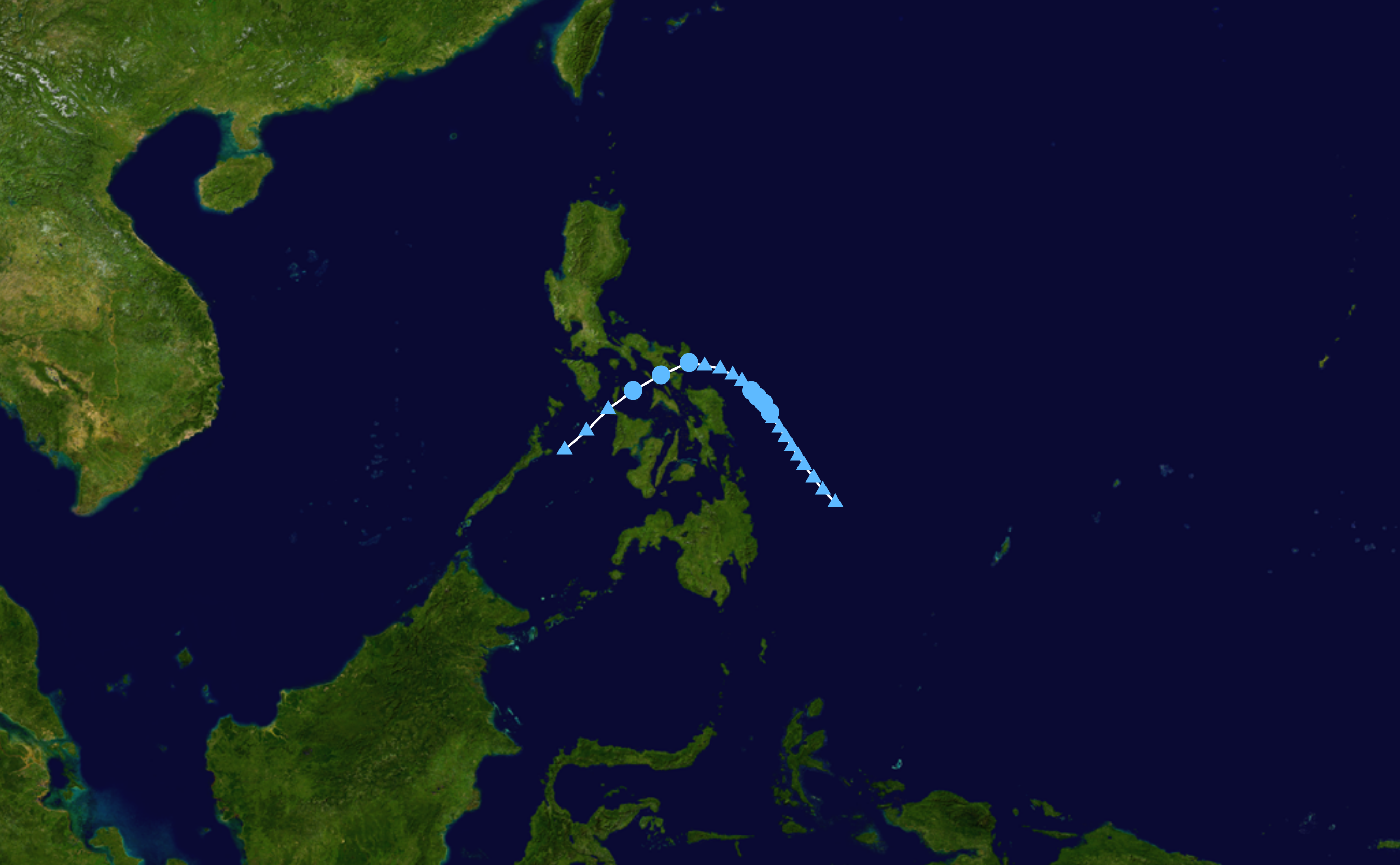
- Duration: December 1 – December 4
- Peak intensity: 55 km/h (35 mph) (10-min); 1004 hPa (mbar)

Tropical Depressions 32W and 33W, though operationally treated as two separate cyclones, were in actuality one system; a relative rare event that shows the difficulties of tracking poorly organized storms. 32 developed on November 30 east of the Philippines. Operationally it was said to have tracked to the northeast and dissipated, with a second area of convection to the west becoming 33W. 32's convection became disorganized with the shower activity heading northeastward, but the low level circulation remained behind and headed westward to be called 33. The depression headed west-southwest, where it brought heavy rain to the Philippines on the 4th and 5th, killing 14 people. The most recent example prior to this system that had two names was Tropical Storm Ken-Lola in the 1989 Pacific typhoon season.

=== Tropical Depression 34W ===
- Tropical depression (JMA)
- Tropical depression (SSHWS)
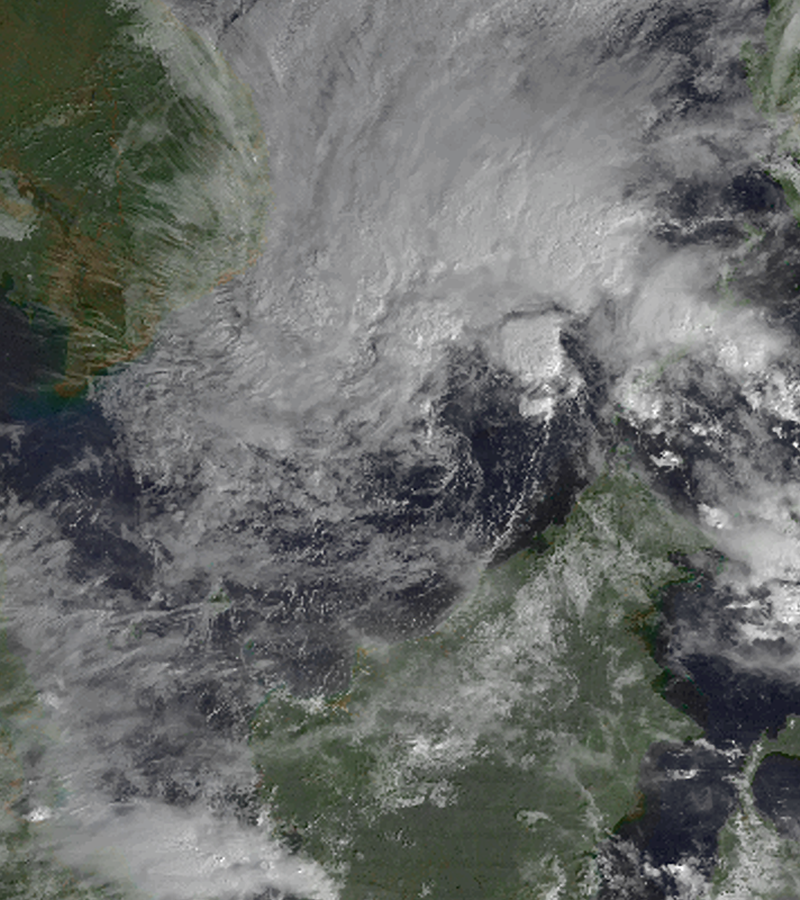
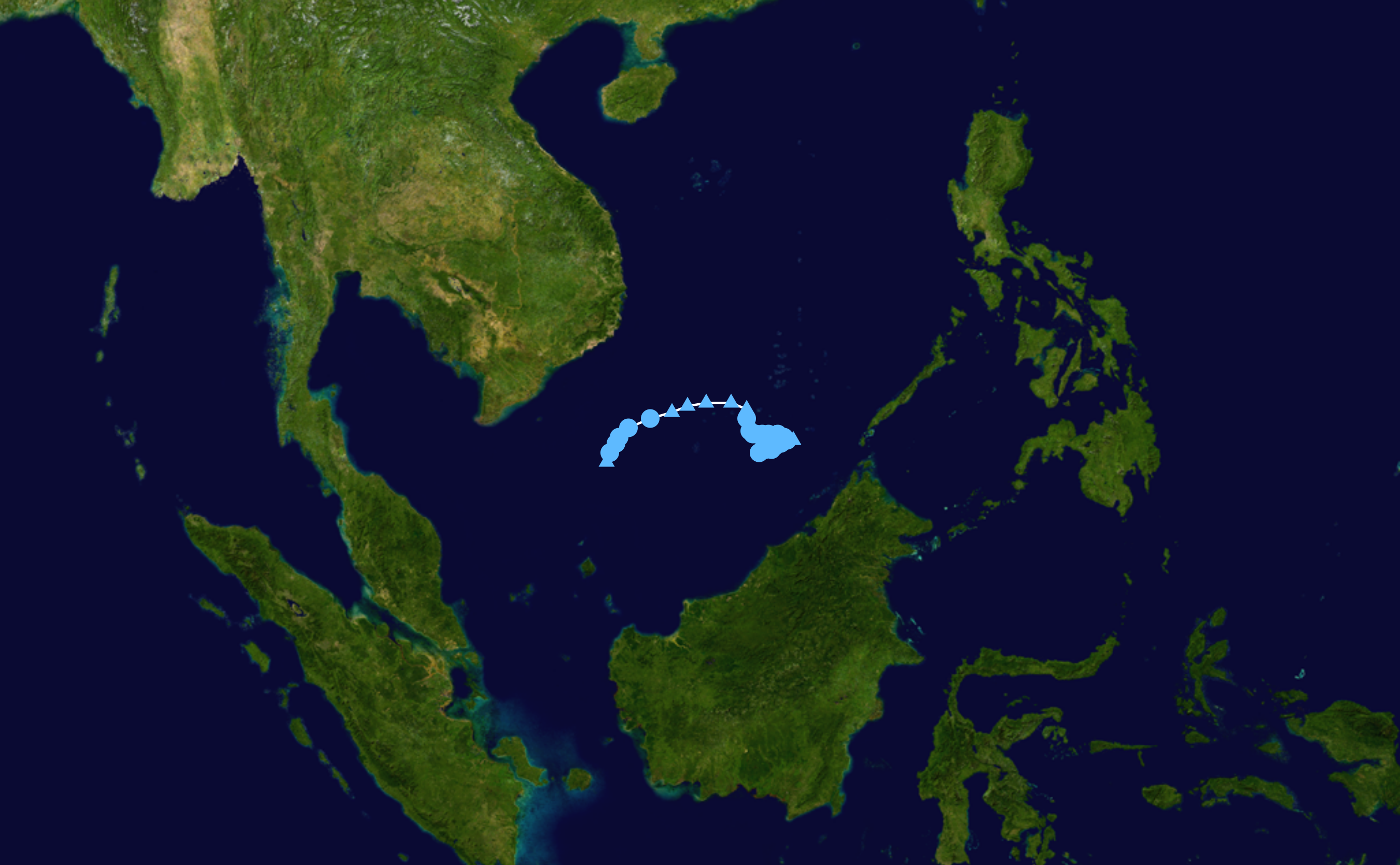
- Duration: December 7 – December 14
- Peak intensity: 55 km/h (35 mph) (10-min); 1002 hPa (mbar)

34W stayed at sea.

=== Severe Tropical Storm Dan (Trining) ===
- Severe tropical storm (JMA)
- Tropical storm (SSHWS)
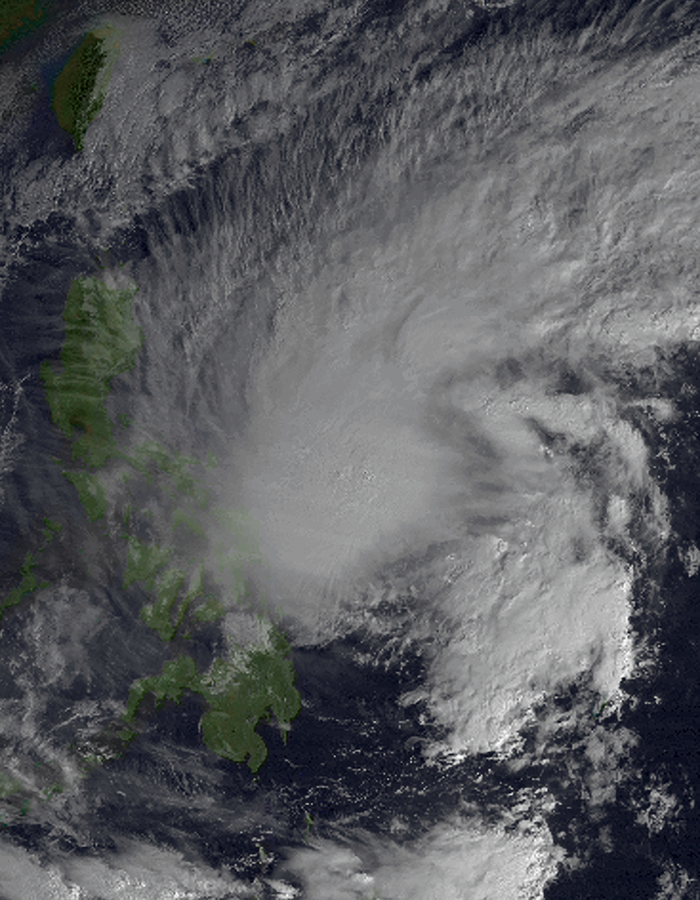
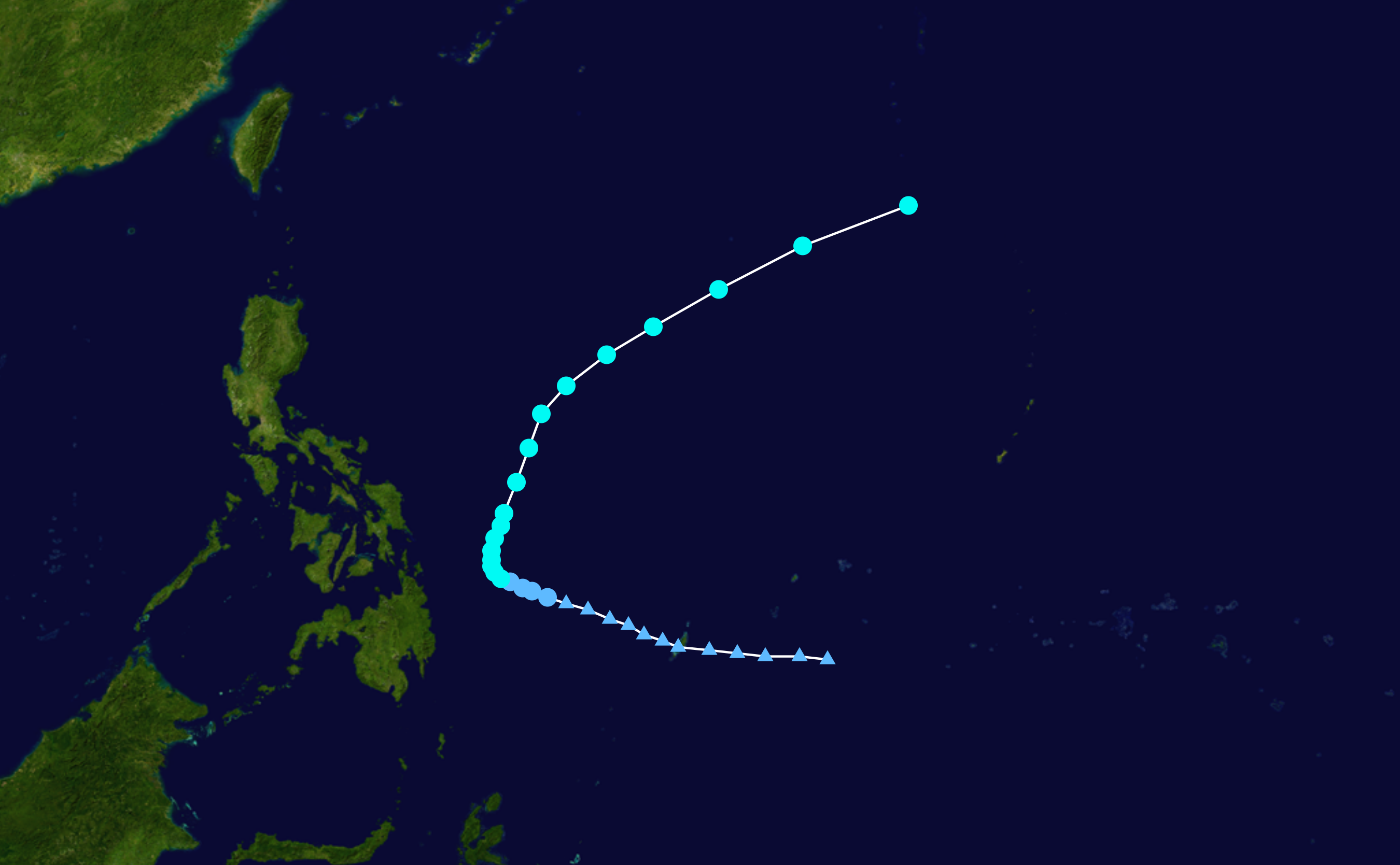
- Duration: December 25 – December 31
- Peak intensity: 100 km/h (65 mph) (10-min); 985 hPa (mbar)

Dan brought rains to the eastern Philippines during the last days of 1995.

== Storm names ==
During the season 24 named tropical cyclones developed in the Western Pacific and were named by the Joint Typhoon Warning Center, when it was determined that they had become tropical storms. These names were contributed to a revised list from mid-1989. However this is the last season using this naming list since the JTWC revised a new naming list in 1996.

Chuck	Deanna	Eli	Faye	Gary	Helen	Irving	Janis	Kent	Lois	Mark	Nina	
Oscar	Polly	Ryan	Sibyl	Ted	Val	Ward	Yvette	Zack	Angela	Brian	Colleen	Dan

=== Philippines ===
Auring	Bebeng	Karing	Diding	Etang
Gening	Helming	Ising	Luding	Mameng
Neneng	Oniang	Pepang	Rosing	Sendang
Trining	Ulding (unused)	Warling (unused)	Yayang (unused)	
Auxiliary list
				Ading (unused)
Barang (unused)	Krising (unused)	Dadang (unused)	Erling (unused)	Goying (unused)

The Philippine Atmospheric, Geophysical and Astronomical Services Administration uses its own naming scheme for tropical cyclones in their area of responsibility. PAGASA assigns names to tropical depressions that form within their area of responsibility and any tropical cyclone that might move into their area of responsibility. Should the list of names for a given year prove to be insufficient, names are taken from an auxiliary list, the first 10 of which are published each year before the season starts. Names not retired from this list will be used again in the 1999 season. This is the same list used for the 1991 season, with the exception of Ulding, which replaced Uring. PAGASA uses its own naming scheme that starts in the Filipino alphabet, with names of Filipino female names ending with "ng" (A, B, K, D, etc.). Names that were not assigned/going to use are marked in gray.

==== Retirement ====
Due to an extreme death toll caused by Typhoon Rosing in the Philippines, PAGASA later retired the name Rosing and was replaced by Rening for the 1999 season.

== Season effects ==
This table summarizes all the systems that developed within or moved into the North Pacific Ocean, to the west of the International Date Line during 1995. The tables also provide an overview of a systems intensity, duration, land areas affected and any deaths or damages associated with the system.

Name	Dates	Peak intensity			Areas affected	Damage (USD)	Deaths	Ref(s).
Name	Dates	Category	Wind speed	Pressure	Areas affected	Damage (USD)	Deaths	Ref(s).
01W	January 7 – 8	Tropical depression	55 km/h (34 mph)	1000 hPa (29.53 inHg)	Marshall Islands	None	None	
Chuck	April 27 – May 4	Tropical storm	65 km/h (40 mph)	998 hPa (29.47 inHg)	Marshall Islands, Caroline Islands	None	None	
TD	May 13 – 15	Tropical depression	Not specified	996 hPa (29.41 inHg)	Ryukyu Islands	None	None	
TD	May 24 – 25	Tropical depression	Not specified	1008 hPa (29.77 inHg)	None	None	None	
TD	May 30 – June 2	Tropical depression	55 km/h (34 mph)	1004 hPa (29.65 inHg)	South China	None	None	
Deanna (Auring)	June 1 – 8	Tropical storm	75 km/h (47 mph)	996 hPa (29.41 inHg)	Philippines, Taiwan, Ryukyu Islands	$15.5 million	None	
Eli	June 4 – 9	Tropical depression	75 km/h (47 mph)	1002 hPa (29.59 inHg)	None	None	None	
TD	June 8 – 9	Tropical depression	Not specified	1000 hPa (29.53 inHg)	South China	None	None	
TD	June 28 – 29	Tropical depression	Not specified	1004 hPa (29.65 inHg)	Vietnam	None	None	
TD	July 7 – 8	Tropical depression	Not specified	1000 hPa (29.53 inHg)	None	None	None	
TD	July 16 – 19	Tropical depression	Not specified	1006 hPa (29.71 inHg)	Vietnam	None	None	
Faye	July 16 – 25	Typhoon	140 km/h (87 mph)	950 hPa (28.05 inHg)	Mariana Islands, Ryukyu Islands, Korean Peninsula	$30 million	16	
06W	July 25 – 28	Tropical depression	65 km/h (40 mph)	1004 hPa (29.65 inHg)	Philippines	None	None	
Gary (Bebeng)	July 28 – August 2	Severe tropical storm	100 km/h (62 mph)	980 hPa (28.94 inHg)	Philippines, China	$24 million	2	
TD	July 28 – 30	Tropical depression	Not specified	998 hPa (29.47 inHg)	South China, Vietnam	None	None	
TD	July 30	Tropical depression	Not specified	1016 hPa (30.01 inHg)	None	None	None	
Helen (Karing)	August 7 – 13	Severe tropical storm	110 km/h (68 mph)	985 hPa (29.09 inHg)	Philippines, South China	$160 million	23	
TD	August 7 – 8	Tropical depression	Not specified	1010 hPa (29.83 inHg)	None	None	None	
Irving (Diding)	August 17 – 20	Tropical storm	85 km/h (53 mph)	90 hPa (29.23 inHg)	South China	None	None	
Janis (Etang)	August 20 – 26	Tropical storm	75 km/h (47 mph)	996 hPa (29.41 inHg)	Philippines, Taiwan, Ryukyu Islands, Korean Peninsula	$429 million	45	
11W	August 21 – 22	Tropical depression	45 km/h (28 mph)	1002 hPa (29.59 inHg)	Ryukyu Islands	None	None	
TD	August 22 – 23	Tropical depression	Not specified	1002 hPa (29.83 inHg)	None	None	None	
Kent (Gening)	August 24 – 30	Typhoon	155 km/h (96 mph)	945 hPa (27.91 inHg)	Philippines, Taiwan, China	$419 million	52	
Lois	August 24 – 31	Severe tropical storm	95 km/h (59 mph)	980 hPa (28.94 inHg)	South China, Vietnam, Laos, Thailand	None	None	
Mark	August 30 – September 2	Typhoon	120 km/h (75 mph)	985 hPa (29.09 inHg)	None	None	None	
Nina (Helming)	September 2 – 7	Tropical storm	75 km/h (47 mph)	992 hPa (29.29 inHg)	Philippines, South Korea	None	None	
16W	September 5 – 10	Tropical depression	45 km/h (28 mph)	1006 hPa (29.71 inHg)	Vietnam	None	None	
TD	September 9 – 10	Tropical depression	Not specified	1006 hPa (29.71 inHg)	None	None	None	
Oscar	September 12 – 17	Very strong typhoon	185 km/h (115 mph)	925 hPa (27.32 inHg)	Mariana Islands, Japan	$6.7 million	8	
Polly (Ising)	September 14 – 21	Typhoon	140 km/h (87 mph)	960 hPa (28.35 inHg)	None	None	None	
Ryan (Luding)	September 15 – 24	Typhoon	155 km/h (96 mph)	940 hPa (27.46 inHg)	Philippines, Taiwan, Japan	$377 million	5	
Sibyl (Mameng)	September 27 – October 4	Severe tropical storm	95 km/h (59 mph)	985 hPa (28.95 inHg)	Philippines, China	$279 million	192	
21W	September 28 – 29	Tropical depression	55 km/h (34 mph)	1006 hPa (29.71 inHg)	Vietnam	None	None	
22W	September 30 – October 1	Tropical depression	55 km/h (34 mph)	1016 hPa (30.01 inHg)	None	None	None	
23W	October 5 – 6	Tropical depression	45 km/h (28 mph)	1004 hPa (29.65 inHg)	Vietnam	None	None	
Ted	October 7 – 14	Severe tropical storm	95 km/h (59 mph)	990 hPa (29.23 inHg)	Philippines, South China	$433 million	61	
Val	October 8 – 14	Tropical storm	75 km/h (47 mph)	996 hPa (29.41 inHg)	Mariana Islands	None	None	
TD	October 11	Tropical depression	Not specified	1006 hPa (29.71 inHg)	None	None	None	
Ward (Neneng)	October 16 – 22	Typhoon	155 km/h (96 mph)	940 hPa (27.46 inHg)	Mariana Islands	None	None	
Yvette (Oniang)	October 23 – 27	Severe tropical storm	95 km/h (59 mph)	985 hPa (28.95 inHg)	Philippines, Vietnam, Cambodia, Laos, Thailand	Unknown	Unknown	
Zack (Pepang)	October 24 – November 2	Very strong typhoon	165 km/h (103 mph)	950 hPa (28.05 inHg)	Caroline Islands, Philippines, Vietnam, Cambodia	$90 million	110	
Angela (Rosing)	October 25 – November 7	Violent typhoon	215 km/h (134 mph)	910 hPa (26.87 inHg)	Caroline Islands, Philippines, South China, Vietnam	$315 million	936	
Brian	November 1 – 3	Tropical storm	75 km/h (47 mph)	998 hPa (29.47 inHg)	Mariana Islands	None	None	
Colleen	November 13 – 14	Tropical depression	65 km/h (40 mph)	1004 hPa (29.65 inHg)	None	None	None	
32W/33W (Sendang)	December 1 – 4	Tropical depression	55 km/h (34 mph)	1004 hPa (29.65 inHg)	Philippines	None	14	
34W	December 7 – 14	Tropical depression	65 km/h (40 mph)	1002 hPa (29.59 inHg)	Vietnam	None	None	
Dan (Trining)	December 25 – 31	Severe tropical storm	100 km/h (62 mph)	985 hPa (28.95 inHg)	Caroline Islands, Philippines	Unknown	Unknown	
Season aggregates
47 systems	January 7 – December 31		215 km/h (130 mph)	915 hPa (27.02 inHg)		$2.58 billion	1464	

== See also ==
- Tropical cyclones in 1995
- Pacific typhoon season
- 1995 Pacific hurricane season
- 1995 Atlantic hurricane season
- 1995 North Indian Ocean cyclone season
- South-West Indian Ocean cyclone season: 1994-95, 1995-96
- Australian region cyclone season: 1994-95, 1995-96
- South Pacific cyclone season: 1994-95, 1995-96
