= Tlaxco Municipality =

Tlaxco Municipality may refer to:

- Tlaxco Municipality, Puebla
- Tlaxco Municipality, Tlaxcala

== See also ==
- Tlaxco (disambiguation)
