= Tlaxco =

Tlaxco may refer to various places in Mexico:

- Tlaxco Municipality, Puebla
- Tlaxco Municipality, Tlaxcala
- Tlaxco, Coxcatlán
- Tlaxco, Xalpatlahuac

== See also ==
- Tlaxco Municipality (disambiguation)
