= Tlaxco Municipality, Puebla =

Tlaxco
- Municipality
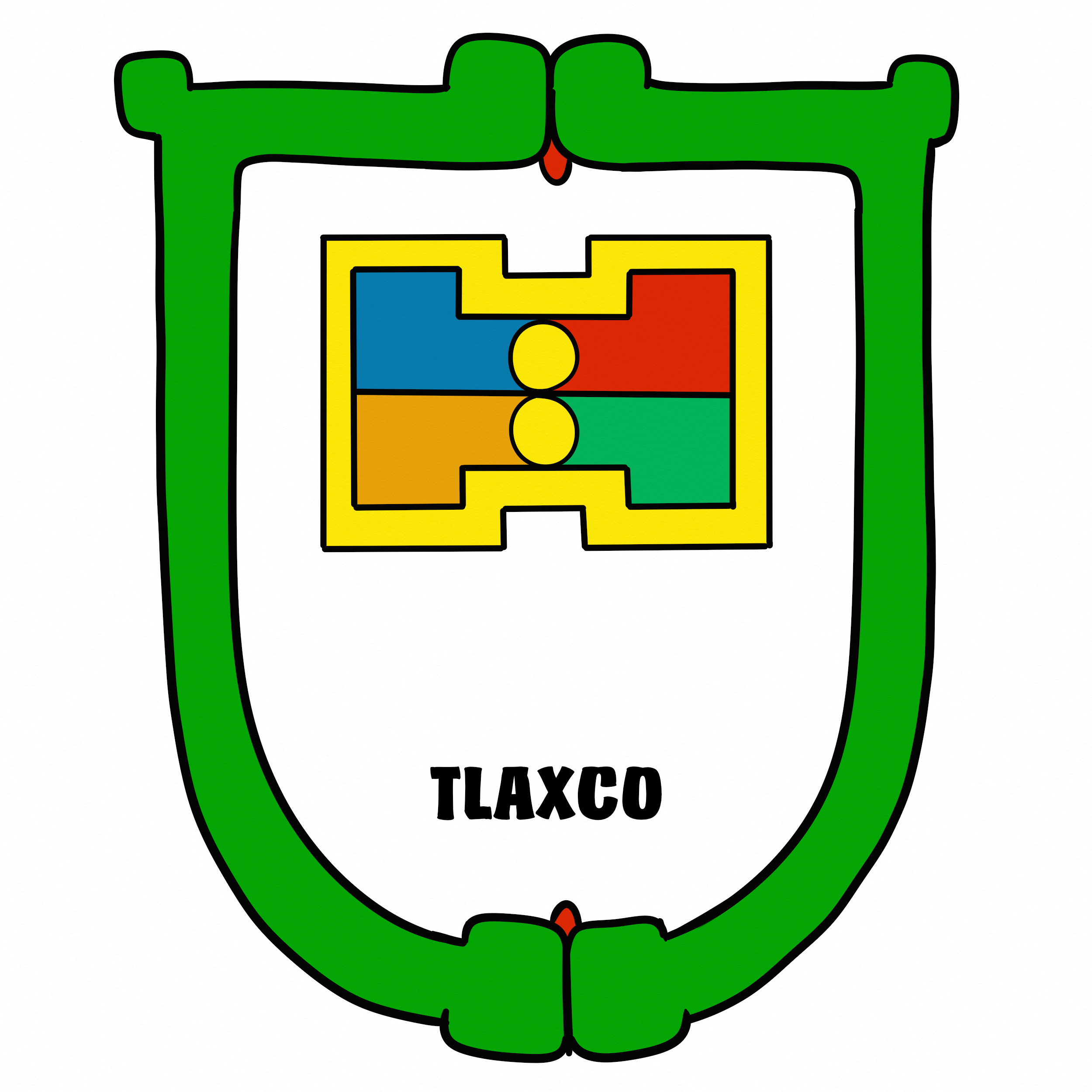
- Coat of arms

- Location within Puebla (state) Location within Mexico
- Coordinates: 20°25′12″N 98°01′48″W
- Country: Mexico
- State: Puebla
- Time zone: UTC-6 (Central)

Tlaxco is a town and its surrounding municipality in the Mexican state of Puebla.
