= Tropical cyclones in 1995 =

Year boundaries
- First system: Bentha
- Formed: January 2, 1995
- Last system: Dan
- Dissipated: December 31, 1995

Strongest system
- Name: Angela
- Lowest pressure: 910 mbar (hPa); inHg

Longest lasting system
- Name: Luis
- Duration: 15 days

Year statistics
- Total systems: 110
- Named systems: 74
- Total fatalities: 2182
- Total damage: $13.62 billion (1995 USD)
Related articles
- 1995 Atlantic hurricane season
- 1995 Pacific hurricane season
- 1995 Pacific typhoon season
- 1995 North Indian Ocean cyclone season
- 1994–95 South-West Indian Ocean cyclone season
- 1995–96 South-West Indian Ocean cyclone season
- 1994–95 Australian region cyclone season
- 1995–96 Australian region cyclone season
- 1994–95 South Pacific cyclone season
- 1995–96 South Pacific cyclone season

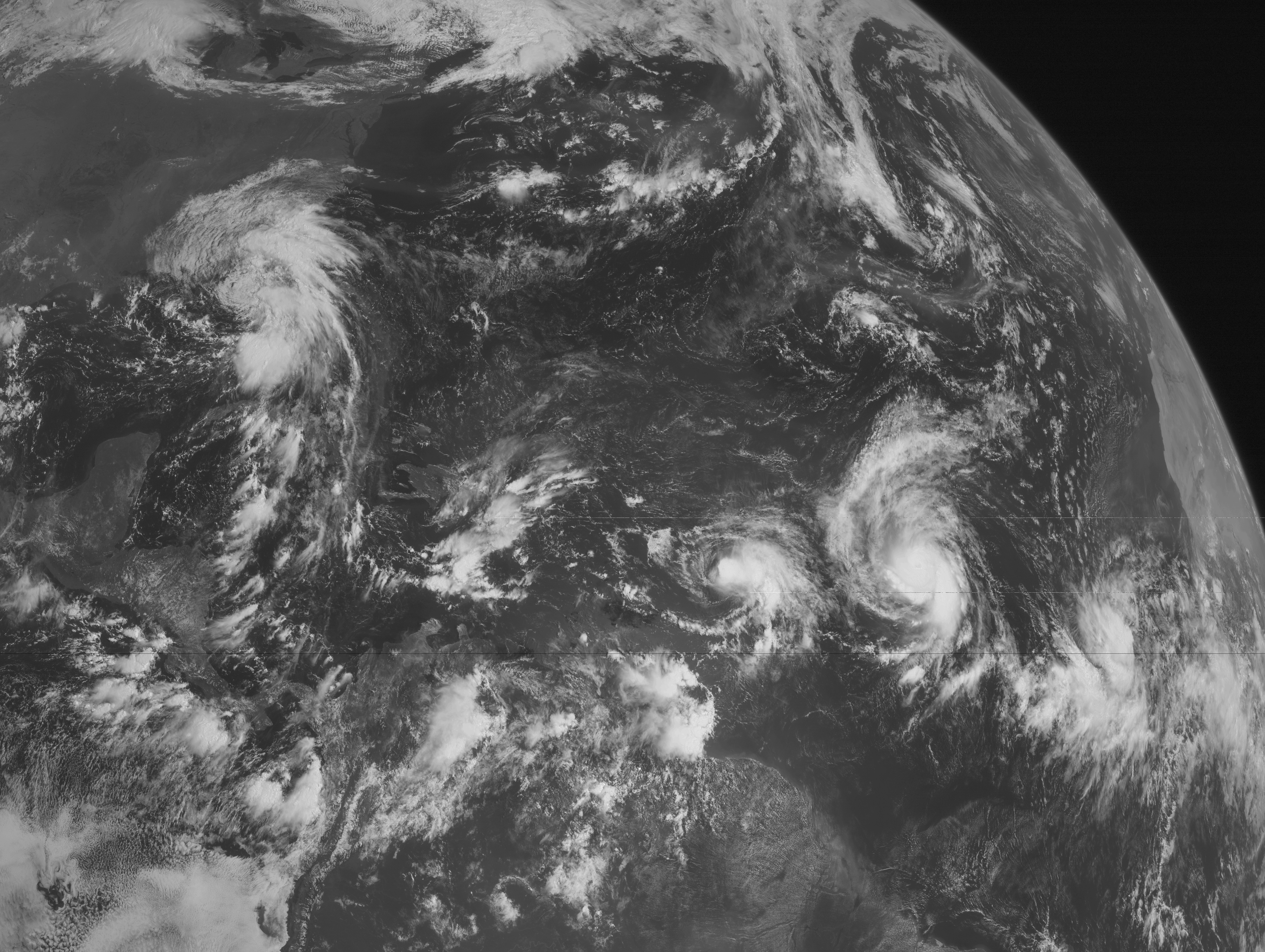
3 tropical cyclones simultaneously active in the Atlantic Ocean with 2 disturbances on August 24. From left to right: Tropical Storm Jerry, Hurricane Iris, Hurricane Humberto, a disturbance which would develop into Tropical Storm Karen, and a disturbance which would become Hurricane Luis.

During 1995, tropical cyclones formed within seven different bodies of water called basins. To date, 110 tropical cyclones formed, of which 74 were given names by various weather agencies. The strongest storm and the deadliest storm of the year was Typhoon Angela, which reached a minimum central pressure of 910 hPa (26.87 inHg) and caused a total of 936 deaths throughout the Philippines. The costliest storm of the year was Hurricane Opal, which caused $4.7 billion in damage throughout Central America and the Gulf Coast of the United States. The accumulated cyclone energy (ACE) index for the 1995 (seven basins combined), as calculated by Colorado State University was 779.3 units.

1995 was a slightly below-average year for tropical cyclone formation; the most active basin of the year was the Western Pacific basin, featuring a slightly below-average number of storms. The Northern Atlantic was highly active, becoming the fourth-most active hurricane season on record. Both the Eastern Pacific and the Northern Indian Ocean basins were below-average, with the Eastern Pacific featuring 11 systems, a record low for the basin. The Southern Hemisphere was relatively average, with the exception of the Southern Pacific, where both the 1994–95 and 1995–96 seasons became some of the most inactive seasons in the basin on record. Four Category 5 tropical cyclones were formed in 1995.

== Global atmospheric and hydrological conditions ==
During the early months of 1995, an El Niño was still in effect throughout the Eastern Pacific, though by June it had transitioned into a La Niña as the waters cooled rapidly.

== Systems ==
=== January ===
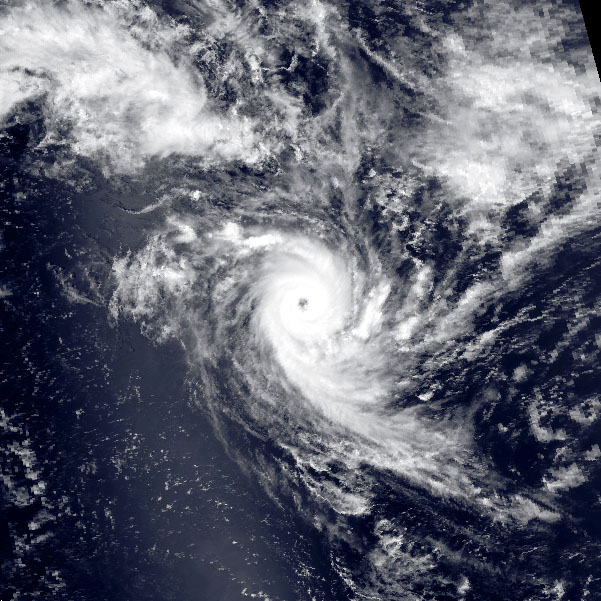
Cyclone Dorina

January was an inactive month, featuring only 6 systems of which 5 attained gale-force winds and were named. Bentha stayed mostly out to sea, bringing rainfall and winds to the Mascarene Islands. Celeno was a rare tropical cyclone that formed in the Mediterranean Sea, making landfall in Libya. Dorina was the strongest storm of the month, peaking as an intense tropical cyclone. Fodah affected the landmasses surrounding the Mozambique Channel and Gail produced heavy gusts in the Mascarene Islands. Only 1 storm, 01W, was not part of the 1994–95 South-West Indian Ocean cyclone season.

Tropical cyclones formed in January 1995
Storm name	Dates active	Max wind km/h (mph)	Pressure (hPa)	Areas affected	Damage (USD)	Deaths	Refs
Bentha	January 2–6	85 (50)	984	Mascarene Islands, Tromelin Island		None	
01W	January 7–8	55 (35)	1000	Marshall Islands	None	None	
Celeno	January 14–17	55 (35)	Not specified	Libya	Unknown	Unknown	
Dorina	January 18–February 1	175 (110)	925	Mascarene Islands		None	
Fodah	January 22–28	100 (65)	970	Mozambique, Madagascar		None	
Gail	January 31–February 11	120 (75)	970	Mascarene Islands		None	

=== February ===
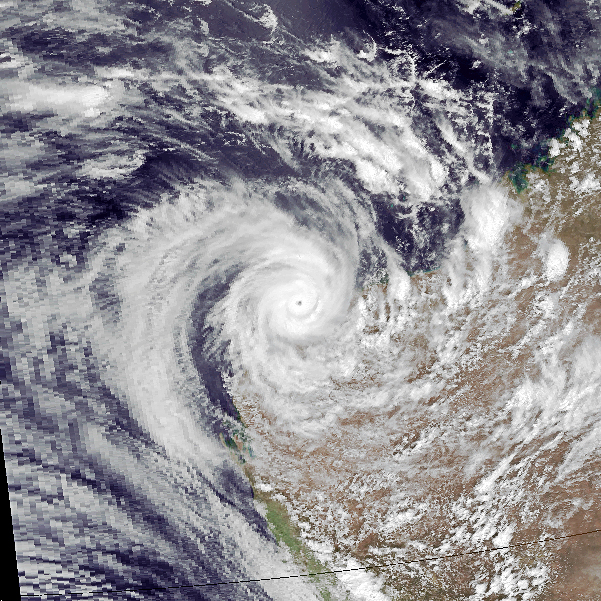
Cyclone Bobby

February was an extremely inactive month, featuring only 3 systems of which all 3 were named by their respective Regional Specialized Meteorological Centres. Heida, the first storm of the month, stayed out to sea, affecting no landmasses. Bobby became the strongest storm of the month, making landfall near Onslow on February 25, causing $8.5 million in damages and killing 8 people as a result. Ingrid was also a relatively strong storm, causing wind gusts over the Mascarene Islands.

Tropical cyclones formed in February 1995
Storm name	Dates active	Max wind km/h (mph)	Pressure (hPa)	Areas affected	Damage (USD)	Deaths	Refs
Heida	February 3–8	75 (45)	990	None	None	None	
Bobby	February 19–27	195 (120)	925	Western Australia, Northern Territory	$8.5 million	8	
Ingrid	February 22–March 3	150 (90)	945	Mascarene Islands		None	

=== March ===
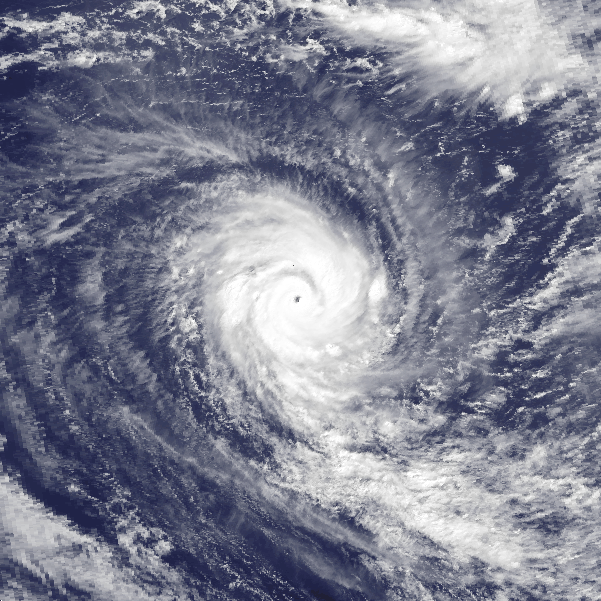
Cyclone Marlene

Tropical cyclones formed in March 1995
Storm name	Dates active	Max wind km/h (mph)	Pressure (hPa)	Areas affected	Damage (USD)	Deaths	Refs
Violet	March 2–8	155 (100)	960	Queensland	None	None	
Warren	March 4–7	150 (90)	960	Queensland, Northern Territory	None	None	
Josta	March 5–12	105 (65)	972	Tanzania, Mozambique, Comoros, Madagascar		None	
Kylie	March 6–14	85 (50)	984	Mascarene Islands		None	
Lidy	March 14–20	55 (35)	996	Mascarene Islands		None	
18P	March 16–17	55 (35)	1000	Fiji	None	None	
Marlene	March 29–April 11	185 (115)	920	None		None	

=== April ===
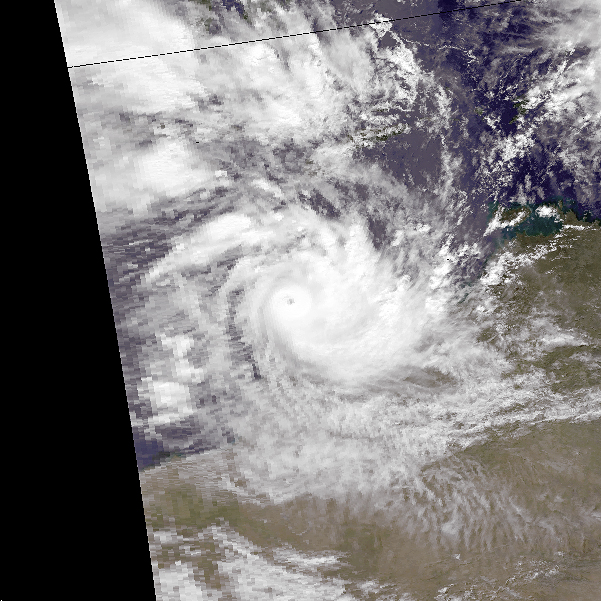
Cyclone Chloe

April was an extremely inactive month, featuring only 4 systems, of which 2 had gale-force winds and were named. Chloe was the first storm of the month, reaching the highest category on the Australian scale, making it the strongest storm of the month. Chloe made landfall just shy of peak intensity. 20P was a short-lived system, lasting for only one day. Cyclone Agnes was a strong but also small cyclone, peaking as a Category-3 equivalent cyclone. Tropical Storm Chuck was the final storm of the month, staying out to sea for the duration of its life.

Tropical cyclones formed in April 1995
Storm name	Dates active	Max wind km/h (mph)	Pressure (hPa)	Areas affected	Damage (USD)	Deaths	Refs
Chloe	April 3–9	220 (140)	920	Western Australia, Northern Territory	None	None	
20P	April 3–4	45 (30)	1004	None	None	None	
Agnes	April 16–23	185 (115)	945	Papua New Guinea	None	None	
Chuck	April 27–May 4	65 (40)	998	Marshall Islands, Caroline Islands	None	None	

=== May ===
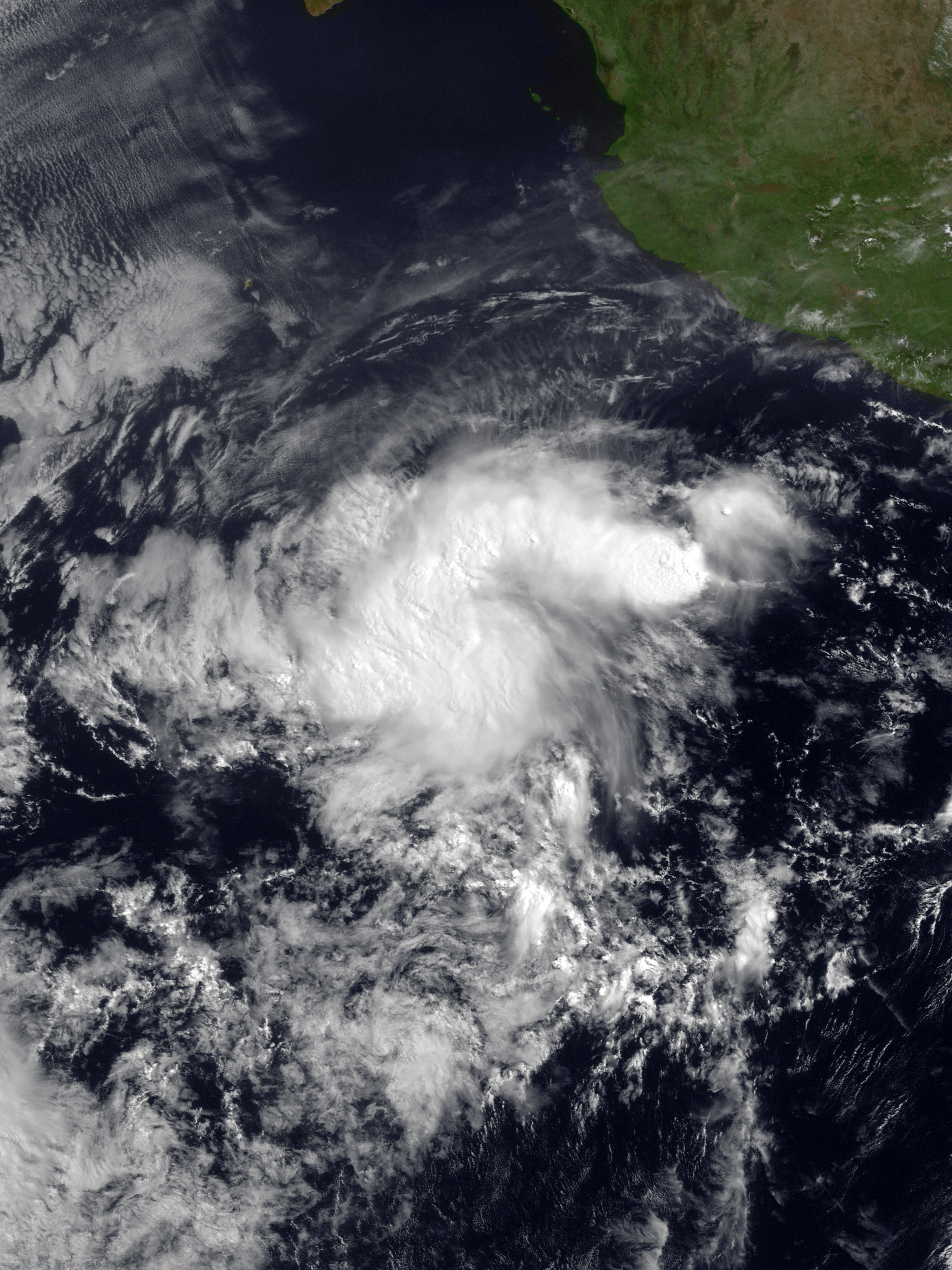
Tropical Depression One-E

May was an exceptionally weak month, with none of the 7 systems that formed intensifying into tropical storms. BOB 01 and BOB 02 were the first storms of the month, with BOB 02 causing 39 fatalities in Andhra Pradesh. A tropical depression formed thereafter and became the strongest storm of the month, with a minimum central pressure of 996 hPa. BOB 03 formed a day later, killing 107 people in Odisha. One-E became the first storm of the 1995 Pacific hurricane season; it affected no landmasses. The month finished with 2 tropical depressions forming in the Western Pacific.

Tropical cyclones formed in May 1995
Storm name	Dates active	Max wind km/h (mph)	Pressure (hPa)	Areas affected	Damage (USD)	Deaths	Refs
BOB 01	May 5–7	55 (35)	Not specified	South India	None	None	
BOB 02	May 8–10	55 (35)	Not specified	Andhra Pradesh	None	39	
TD	May 13–15	Not specified	996	Ryukyu Islands	None	None	
BOB 03	May 14–18	55 (35)	Not specified	Odisha	None	107	
One-E	May 21–23	55 (35)	1005	None	None	None	
TD	May 24–25	Not specified	1008	None	None	None	
TD	May 30–June 2	55 (35)	1004	South China	None	None	

=== June ===
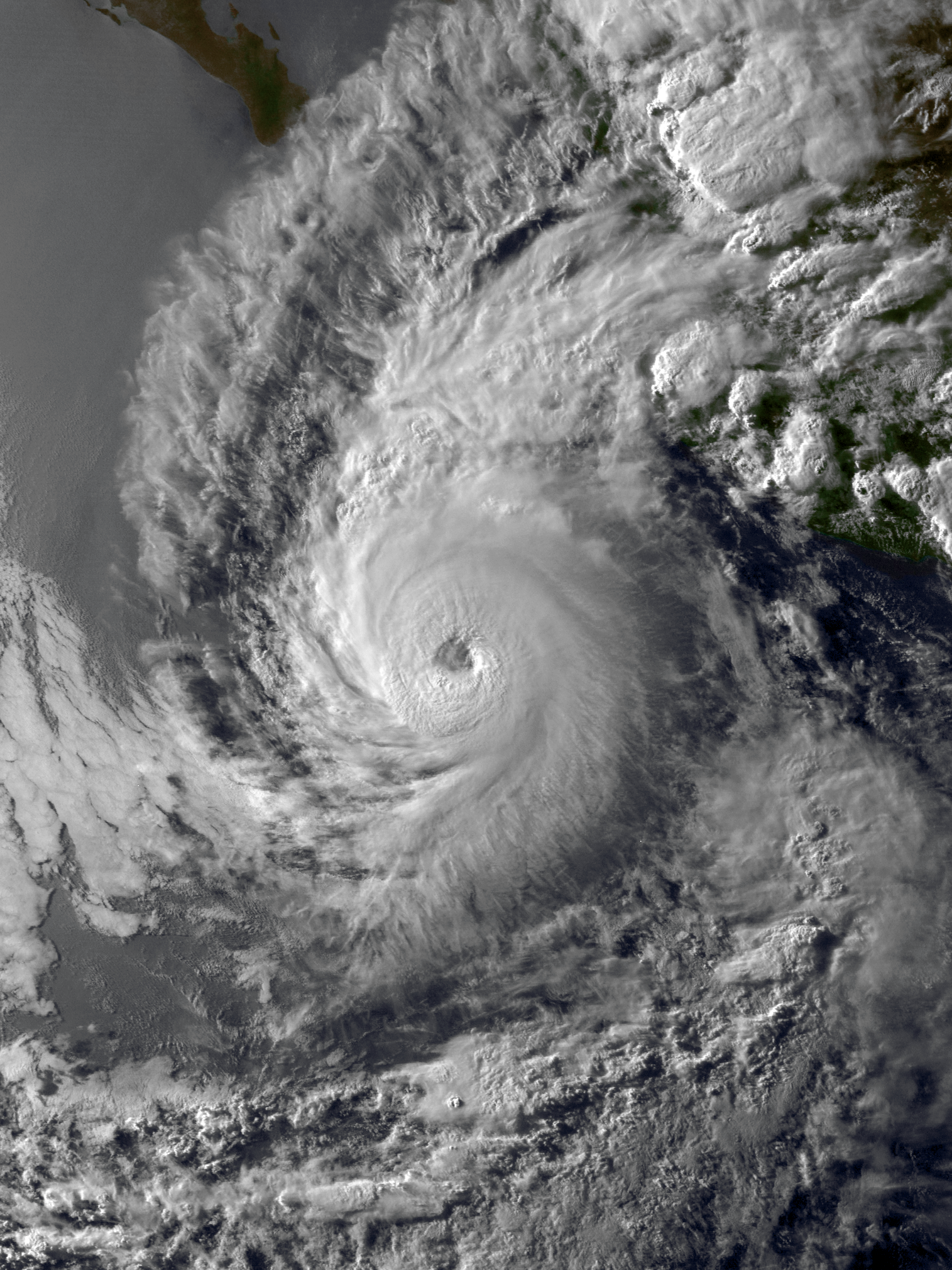
Hurricane Adolph

June was an inactive month, featuring 6 systems, of which 4 were named. Deanna was the first storm of the month, affecting the Philippines, Taiwan, and China. Allison was the second storm of the month and the first in the 1995 Atlantic hurricane season, peaking as a Category 1 hurricane and affecting the Southeastern United States. Tropical Storm Eli and 2 unnamed tropical depression in the Western Pacific were all weak and relatively short-lived. Hurricane Adolph was the last named storm and strongest storm of the month, having peaked with 1-min winds of 130 mph (210 km/h), making it a Category 4 hurricane.

Tropical cyclones formed in June 1995
Storm name	Dates active	Max wind km/h (mph)	Pressure (hPa)	Areas affected	Damage (USD)	Deaths	Refs
Deanna (Auring)	June 1–8	75 (45)	996	Philippines, Taiwan, Ryukyu Islands	None	None	
Allison	June 3–6	120 (75)	987	Yucatán Peninsula, Cuba, Florida, Georgia, Carolinas, Atlantic Canada	$1.7 million	1	
Eli	June 4–9	55 (35)	1002	None	None	None	
TD	June 8–9	Not specified	1000	South China	None	None	
Adolph	June 15–21	215 (130)	948	None	None	None	
TD	June 28–29	Not specified	1004	Vietnam	None	None	

=== July ===
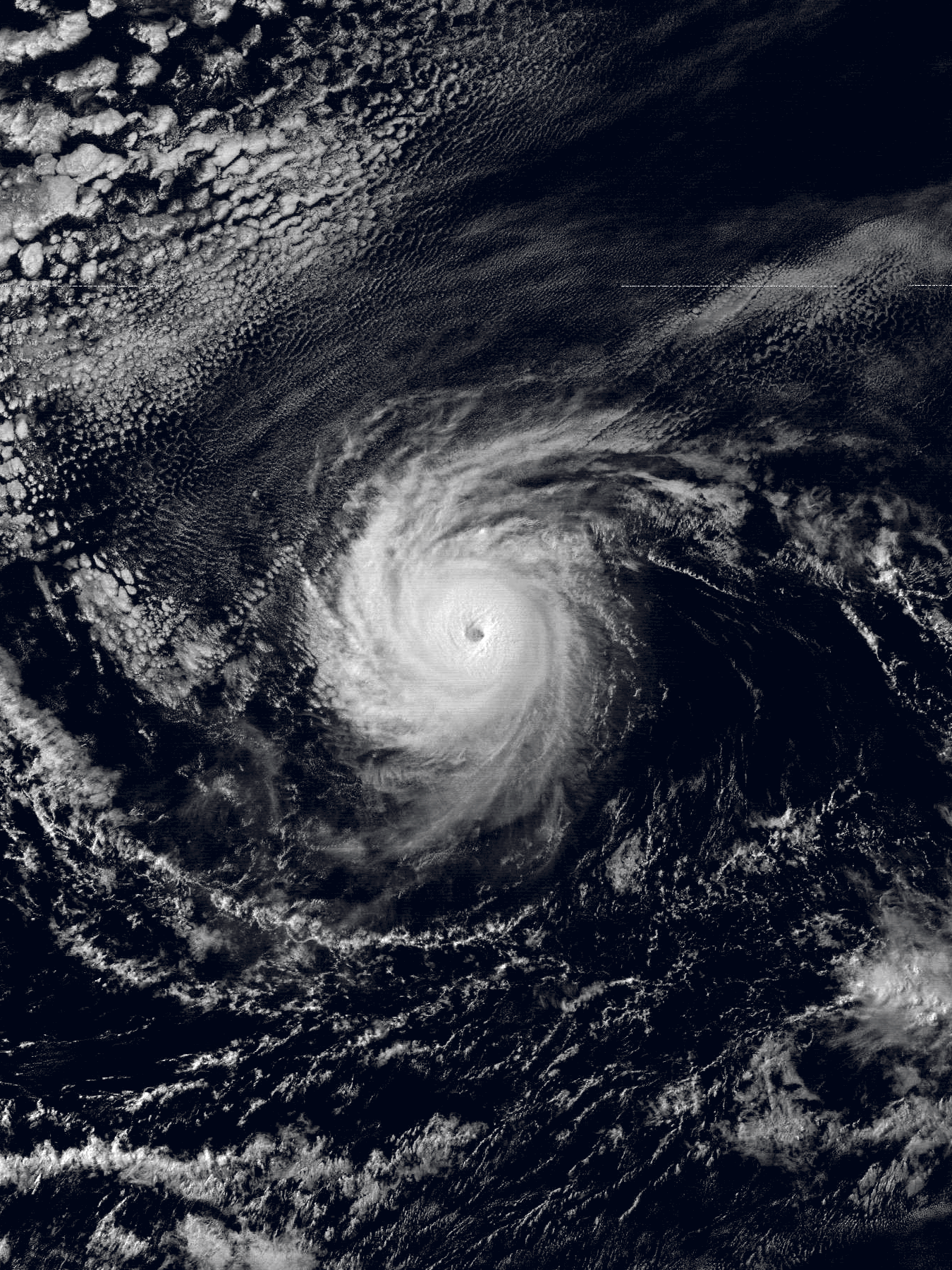
Hurricane Barbara

Tropical cyclones formed in July 1995
Storm name	Dates active	Max wind km/h (mph)	Pressure (hPa)	Areas affected	Damage (USD)	Deaths	Refs
Barry	July 5–10	110 (70)	990	Atlantic Canada	None	None	
Barbara	July 7–18	220 (140)	940	None	None	None	
TD	July 7–8	Not specified	1000	None	None	None	
Chantal	July 12–20	110 (70)	991	Atlantic Canada	None	None	
TD	July 16–19	Not specified	1006	Vietnam	None	None	
Faye (Bebeng)	July 16–25	140 (85)	950	Mariana Islands, Ryukyu Islands, Korea	Unknown	16	
Cosme	July 17–22	120 (75)	985	None	None	None	
Dalila	July 24–August 2	100 (65)	994	None	None	None	
06W	July 25–29	55 (35)	1004	Philippines	None	None	
Dean	July 28–August 2	75 (45)	999	Texas	$500,000	1	
Gary	July 28–August 2	100 (65)	980	Philippines, China	None	2	
TD	July 28–30	Not specified	998	South China, Vietnam	None	None	
TD	July 30	Not specified	1016	None	None	None	
Erin	July 31–August 6	155 (100)	973	Bahamas, Jamaica, Eastern United States, Louisiana, Arkansas, Missouri	$700 million	16	

=== August ===
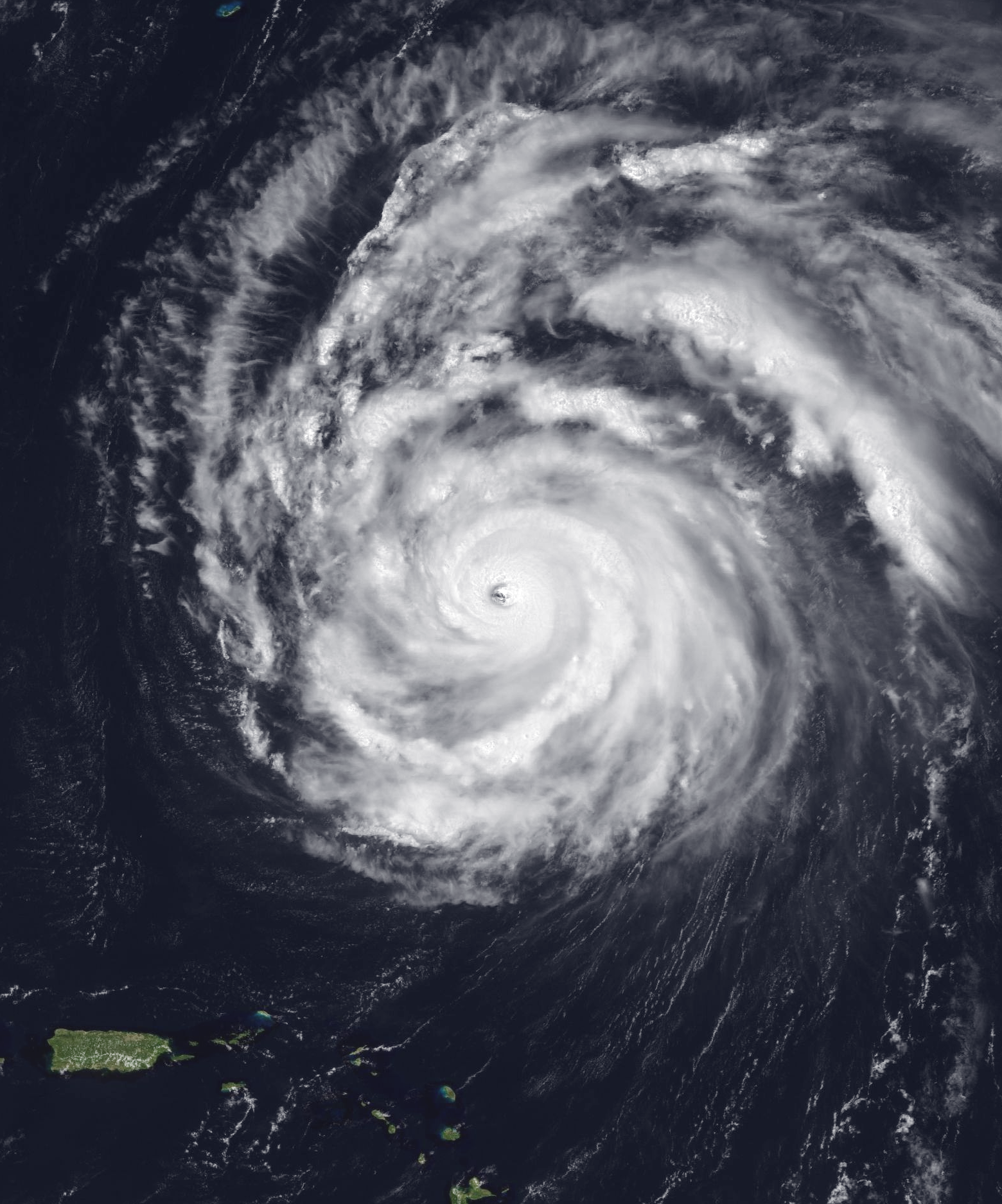
Hurricane Felix

Tropical cyclones formed in August 1995
Storm name	Dates active	Max wind km/h (mph)	Pressure (hPa)	Areas affected	Damage (USD)	Deaths	Refs
Erick	August 1–8	100 (65)	994	None	None	None	
Six	August 5–7	55 (35)	1002	Mexico	None	None	
Flossie	August 7–14	130 (80)	978	Baja California Peninsula	$5 million	1	
Helen (Karing)	August 7–13	110 (70)	985	Philippines, South China	None	None	
TD	August 7–8	Not specified	1010	None	None	None	
Felix	August 8–22	220 (140)	929	Puerto Rico, Bermuda, East Coast of the United States, Atlantic Canada, Iceland, United Kingdom	$3.63 million	9	
Gabrielle	August 9–12	110 (70)	988	Mexico, Texas	Minimal	6	
Irving (Diding)	August 17–20	85 (50)	990	South China	None	None	
Gil	August 19–27	100 (65)	993	Mexico	Minimal	None	
Janis (Etang)	August 20–26	85 (50)	990	Philippines, Taiwan, Ryukyu Islands, Korea	$429 million	45	
11W	August 21–22	45 (30)	1002	Ryukyu Islands	None	None	
Humberto	August 22–September 1	175 (110)	968	None	None	None	
Iris	August 22–September 4	175 (110)	965	Leeward Islands, Europe	Unknown	5	
Jerry	August 22–28	65 (40)	1002	Florida, Georgia, South Carolina, North Carolina	$40 million	8	
TD	August 22–23	Not specified	1002	None	None	None	
Kent (Gening)	August 24–30	155 (100)	945	Philippines, Taiwan, China	$418.9 million	52	
Lois	August 24–31	95 (60)	980	South China, Vietnam, Laos, Thailand	None	None	
Karen	August 26–September 3	85 (50)	1000	None	None	None	
Luis	August 27–September 11	240 (150)	935	Leeward Islands, Virgin Islands, Puerto Rico, Bermuda, Northeastern USA, Newfoundland	$3.3 billion	19	
Mark	August 30–September 2	120 (75)	985	None	None	None	

=== September ===
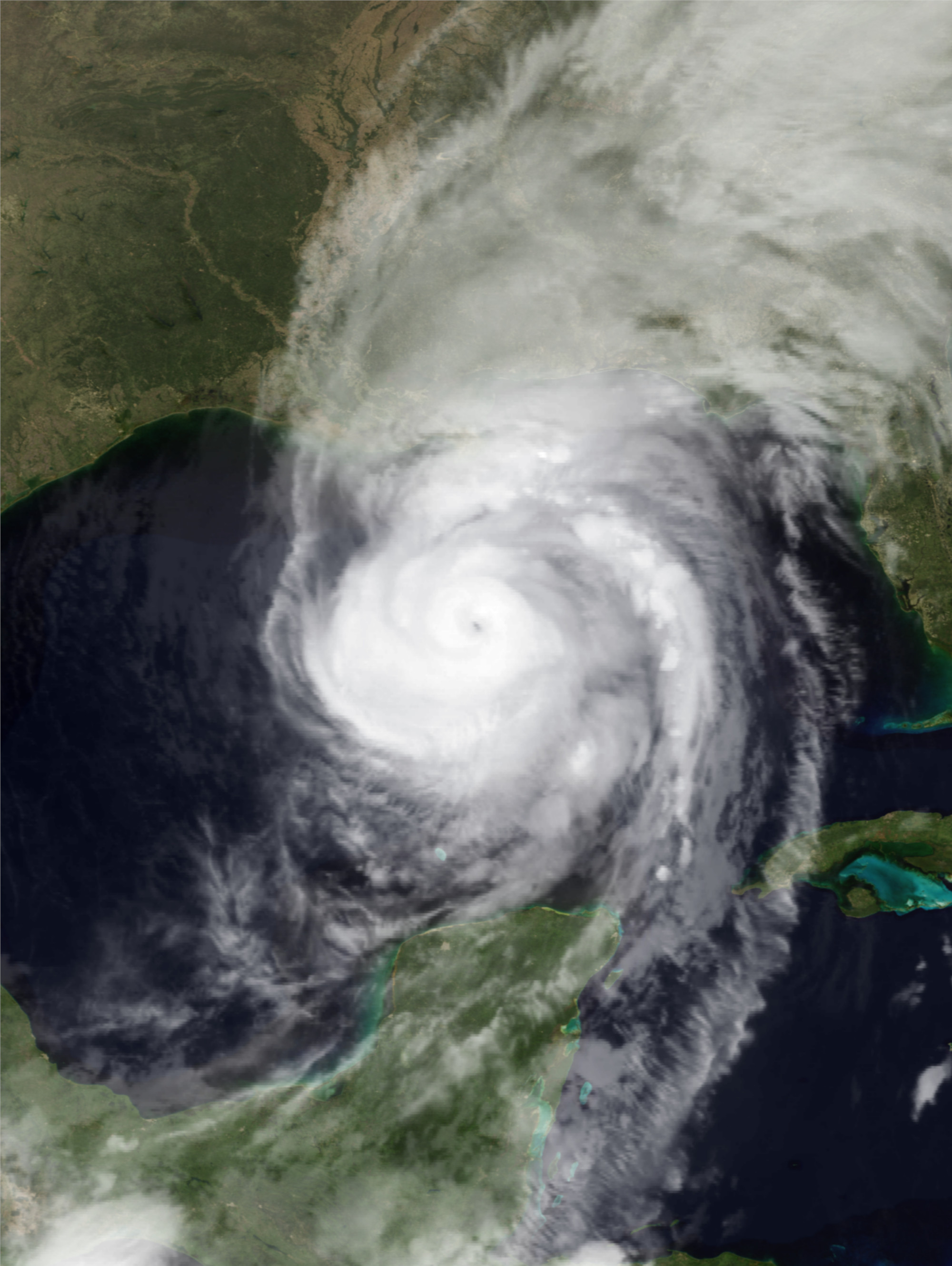
Hurricane Opal

Tropical cyclones formed in September 1995
Storm name	Dates active	Max wind km/h (mph)	Pressure (hPa)	Areas affected	Damage (USD)	Deaths	Refs
Henriette	September 1–8	155 (100)	970	Mexico, Baja California Peninsula	None	None	
Nina (Helming)	September 2–7	75 (45)	992	Philippines, South Korea	None	None	
16W	September 5–10	45 (30)	1005	Vietnam	None	None	
Fourteen	September 9–13	55 (35)	1008	None	None	None	
TD	September 9–10	Not specified	1006	None	None	None	
Marilyn	September 12–22	185 (115)	949	Leeward Islands, Barbados, Martinique, Dominica, Guadeloupe, U.S. Virgin Islands, Puerto Rico, Bermuda	$2.5 billion	13	
Ismael	September 12–16	130 (80)	983	Mexico, Southwestern United States	$26 million	116	
Oscar	September 12–17	185 (115)	925	Japan	$6.7 million	8	
Polly (Ising)	September 14–21	140 (85)	960	None	None	None	
BOB 04	September 15–17	45 (30)	998	Myanmar, Odisha, East India	None	None	
Ryan (Luding)	September 15–24	155 (100)	940	Philippines, Taiwan, Japan	None	None	
Juliette	September 16–26	240 (150)	930	Revillagigedo Islands, Baja California Peninsula, California	None	None	
Noel	September 26–October 7	120 (75)	987	None	None	None	
BOB 05	September 26–28	85 (50)	Not specified	West Bengal, East India	None	None	
Opal	September 27–October 5	240 (150)	916	Guatemala, Yucatán Peninsula, U.S. Gulf Coast, Ohio River Valley, Ontario	$4.7 billion	63	
Sibyl (Mameng)	September 27–October 4	95 (60)	985	Philippines, China	$38.5 million	108	
21W	September 28–29	45 (30)	1006	Vietnam	None	None	
22W	September 30–October 1	55 (35)	1016	None	None	None	

=== October ===
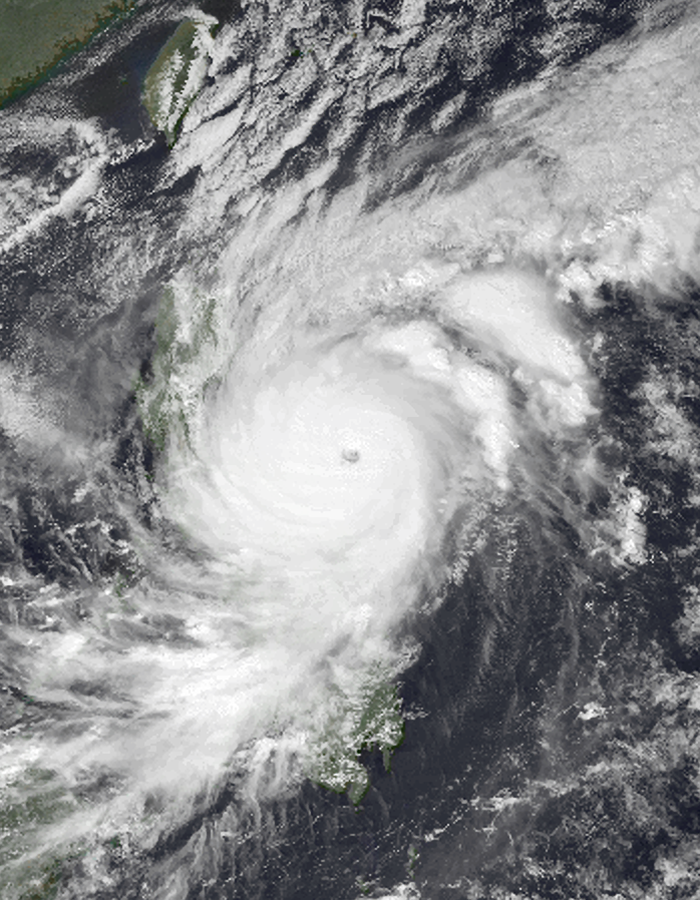
Typhoon Angela

Tropical cyclones formed in October 1995
Storm name	Dates active	Max wind km/h (mph)	Pressure (hPa)	Areas affected	Damage (USD)	Deaths	Refs
Pablo	October 4–8	95 (60)	994	None	None	None	
23W	October 5–6	45 (30)	1004	Vietnam	None	None	
Roxanne	October 7–21	185 (115)	956	Mexico	$1.5 billion	29	
Ted	October 7–14	95 (60)	990	Philippines, South China	None	None	
Val	October 8–14	75 (45)	996	Mariana Islands	None	None	
TD	October 11	Not specified	1006	None	None	None	
ARB 01	October 13–17	85 (50)	996	West India, Oman, Yemen, Somalia	None	None	
Ward (Neneng)	October 16–22	155 (100)	940	Mariana Islands	None	None	
Sebastien	October 20–25	100 (65)	1001	Lesser Antilles, Puerto Rico	None	None	
Yvette (Oniang)	October 23–27	95 (60)	985	Philippines, Vietnam, Cambodia, Laos, Thailand	Unknown	Unknown	
Zack (Pepang)	October 24–November 2	165 (105)	950	Caroline Islands, Philippines, Vietnam, Cambodia	None	110	
Angela (Rosing)	October 25–November 7	215 (130)	910	Micronesia, Philippines, South China, Vietnam	$317 million	936	
Tanya	October 27–November 1	140 (85)	972	Azores	Minimal	1	

=== November ===
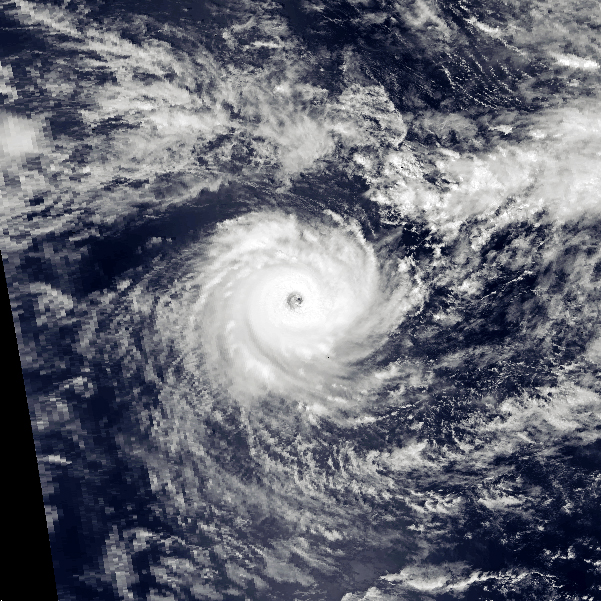
Cyclone Daryl–Agnielle

November was an inactive month, with only 5 systems having formed in the month, of which 3 were named by their respective agencies. Brian was the first storm of the month, having stayed out to sea. BOB 06, also known as the 1995 India cyclone, caused extensive loss of life throughout India and Nepal, with a significant portion of the deaths being related to avalanches or landslides. Colleen was a weak and short-lived storm in the Western Pacific that stayed out to sea. Daryl–Agnielle was a strong cyclone that stayed out to sea, peaking as a Category 5 cyclone on the Saffir–Simpson scale and becoming the strongest storm of the month. BOB 07 was another deadly cyclone, killing 172 people, of which at least 100 were fishermen.

Tropical cyclones formed in November 1995
Storm name	Dates active	Max wind km/h (mph)	Pressure (hPa)	Areas affected	Damage (USD)	Deaths	Refs
Brian	November 1–3	75 (45)	998	Mariana Islands	None	None	
BOB 06	November 6–10	120 (75)	978	India, Bangladesh, Nepal	$48.83 million	236	
Colleen	November 13–14	55 (35)	1004	None	None	None	
Daryl–Agnielle	November 16–27	175 (110)	925	None	None	None	
BOB 07	November 21–25	190 (115)	956	Sumatra, Myanmar, Bangladesh	Unknown	172	

=== December ===
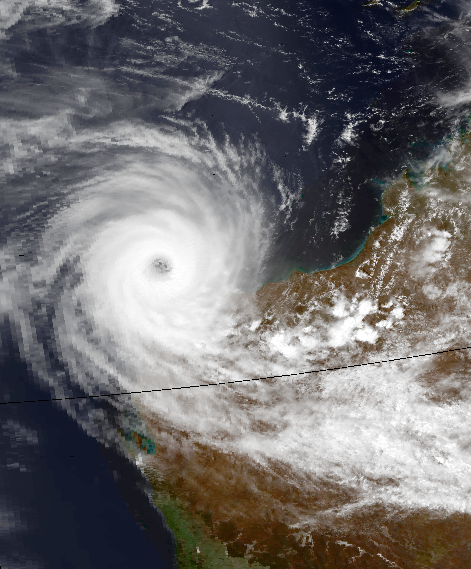
Cyclone Frank

Tropical cyclones formed in December 1995
Storm name	Dates active	Max wind km/h (mph)	Pressure (hPa)	Areas affected	Damage (USD)	Deaths	Refs
32W/33W (Sendang)	December 1–4	55 (35)	1004	Philippines	None	14	
Emma	December 2–16	75 (45)	990	Christmas Island	Minor	None	
Frank	December 6–13	175 (110)	950	Western Australia	Minor	None	
34W	December 7–14	55 (35)	1002	Vietnam	None	None	
Gertie	December 17–24	140 (85)	965	Western Australia	Minor	None	
Dan (Trining)	December 25–31	100 (65)	985	Caroline Islands, Philippines	Unknown	Unknown	
B2	December 28–31	55 (35)	995	Mascarene Islands	Unknown	Unknown	

== Global effects ==
There are a total of seven tropical cyclone basins that tropical cyclones typically form in this table, data from all these basins are added.

Season name		Areas affected	Systems formed	Named storms	Hurricane-force tropical cyclones	Damage (1995 USD)	Deaths	Ref.
North Atlantic Ocean (Note: The wind speeds for this tropical cyclone/basin are based on the Saffir Simpson Scale which uses 1-minute sustained winds.)		Greater Antilles, Southeastern United States, East Coast of the United States, Atlantic Canada, Gulf Coast of the United States, Mid-Atlantic states, Mexico, Bermuda, Leeward Islands, Lesser Antilles, Central America, Yucatan Peninsula, Azores	21	19	11	$12.56 billion	185	
Eastern and Central Pacific Ocean		Baja California Peninsula, Southwestern Mexico, Northern Mexico, Southwestern United States	11	10	7	$31 million	124	
Western Pacific Ocean (Note: Only systems that formed either before or on December 31, 1995 are counted in the seasonal totals.)		Marshall Islands, Caroline Islands, Ryukyu Islands, South China, Philippines, Taiwan, Vietnam, Korean Peninsula, Laos, Thailand, Mariana Islands, Japan, Cambodia	47	24	14	$2.34 billion	1,380	
North Indian Ocean (Note: The wind speeds for this tropical cyclone/basin are based on the IMD Scale which uses 3-minute sustained winds.)		South India, Andhra Pradesh, Myanmar, West Bengal, East India, Bangladesh, Nepal, Oman, Yemen, Somalia, Sumatra	8	3	2	$46.3 million	554	
South-West Indian Ocean	January – June (Note: Only systems that formed either on or after January 1, 1995 are counted in the seasonal totals.) (Note: The wind speeds for this tropical cyclone are based on Météo-France, which uses wind gusts.)	Madagascar, Mauritius, Réunion, Agaléga	9	8	6	Unknown	Unknown	
South-West Indian Ocean	July – December	—N/a	1	—N/a	—N/a	Unknown	—N/a	
Australian region	January – June	Western Australia, Christmas Island, Cocos (Keeling) Islands	7	6	4	$8.5 million	5	
Australian region	July – December	Christmas Island, Western Australia	4	4	3	Unknown	—N/a	
South Pacific Ocean	January – June	—N/a	1	—N/a	—N/a	Unknown	—N/a	
South Pacific Ocean	July – December	—N/a	—N/a	—N/a	—N/a	Unknown	—N/a	
Worldwide		(See above)	109 (Note: The sum of the number of systems in each basin will not equal the number shown as the total. This is because when systems move between basins, it creates a discrepancy in the actual number of systems.)	74	47	$15 billion	2,248	

== See also ==
- Tropical cyclones by year
- List of earthquakes in 1995
- Tornadoes of 1995

== Notes ==
^{2} Only systems that formed either on or after January 1, 1995 are counted in the seasonal totals.
^{3} Only systems that formed either before or on December 31, 1995 are counted in the seasonal totals.
^{4} The wind speeds for this tropical cyclone/basin are based on the IMD Scale which uses 3-minute sustained winds.
^{5} The wind speeds for this tropical cyclone/basin are based on the Saffir Simpson Scale which uses 1-minute sustained winds.
^{6} The wind speeds for this tropical cyclone/basin are based on Météo-France which uses wind gusts.
