= New Zealand cricket team in India in 1995–96 =

International cricket tour

New Zealand's tour of India in 1995-96
| | India | New Zealand |
- Dates: 18 October 1995 – 29 November 1995
| Captains | Mohammad Azharuddin | Lee Germon |

Test series
- Result: India won the 3-match series 1–0
| Most runs | Ajay Jadeja (180) | Lee Germon (91) |
| Most wickets | Anil Kumble (10) | Dion Nash (9) |

One Day International series
- Results: India won the 6-match series 3–2
| Most runs | Manoj Prabhakar (145) | Nathan Astle (200) |
| Most wickets | Manoj Prabhakar (7) | Chris Cairns (8) |
- Player of the series: Manoj Prabhakar (Ind)

The New Zealand national cricket team toured India in the 1995–96 season to play three Test matches and six ODIs. India won the 3-match Test series 1–0 and the 6-match ODI series 3–2 (3rd ODI was abandoned without a ball bowled).

The third Test was heavily affected by the 1995 India cyclone. In the lunch break of the fifth ODI, nine fans were killed when part of the stand collapsed. The teams were not told about the incident, and the match continued. lee germin was made captain of new Zealand in his debut.

== Test series ==
=== 1st Test ===
18–20 October 1995
Scorecard

| New Zealand | v | India |
| 145 (65 overs); Lee Germon 48 (97); Anil Kumble 4/39 (18 overs) | | 228 (70.3 overs); Mohammad Azharuddin 87 (148); Chris Cairns 4/44 (17.4 overs) |
| 233 (73.2 overs); Stephen Fleming 41 (74); Anil Kumble 5/81 (27.2 overs) | | 151/2 (40.5 overs); Ajay Jadeja 73 (92); Matthew Hart 2/34 (9.5 overs) |

India won by 8 wickets
M. Chinnaswamy Stadium, Bangalore
Umpires: S. K. Bansal (Ind) and Mervyn Kitchen (Eng)
Player of the match: Mohammad Azharuddin (Ind)

- New Zealand won the toss and chose to bat.
- Lee Germon (NZ) made his test debut
- Anil Kumble (Ind) claimed his 100th Test wicket in the New Zealand's 1st innings.

=== 2nd Test ===
25–29 October 1995
Scorecard

| India | v | New Zealand |
| 144/2 (71.1 overs); Sachin Tendulkar 52 * (88); Chris Cairns 1/18 (16 overs) |

Match Drawn
MA Chidambaram Stadium, Chennai
Umpires: KT Francis (SL) and S. Venkataraghavan (Ind)
Player of the match: Sachin Tendulkar (Ind)

- No play on day 2, 3 and 5. Rain curtailed play on day 1 and day 4.
- India won the toss and chose to bat.
- Roger Twose (NZ) made his Test debut.

=== 3rd Test ===
8–12 November 1995
Scorecard

| India | v | New Zealand |
| 296/8 (89.5 overs); Ajay Jadeja 45 (71); Dion Nash 4/62 (29 overs) | | 175/8 (88 overs); Mark Greatbatch 50 (117); Narendra Hirwani 6/59 (31 overs) |

Match Drawn
Barabati Stadium, Cuttack
Umpires: V. K. Ramaswamy (Ind) and Ian Robinson (Zim)
Player of the match: Narendra Hirwani (Ind)

- No play on Day 2 and Day 3. Rain curtailed play on day 1.
- India won the toss and chose to bat.

== ODI series ==
=== 1st ODI ===
15 November
Scorecard

| India; 236 (49.1 overs) | v | New Zealand; 237/2 (46.5 overs) |
| Manoj Prabhakar 83 (118); Chris Cairns 2/33 (9.1 overs) | | Martin Crowe 107* (129); Manoj Prabhakar 1/36 (7 overs) |

New Zealand won by 8 wickets
Keenan Stadium, Jamshedpur
Umpires: Chandra Sathe (Ind) and KS Giridharan (Ind)
Player of the match: Martin Crowe (NZ)

- New Zealand won the toss and elected to field.
- ODI debut : Roger Twose (NZ)

=== 2nd ODI ===
18 November
Scorecard

| New Zealand; 145 (44.1 overs) | v | India; 146/4 (43.4 overs) |
| Nathan Astle 59 (86); Manoj Prabhakar 5/33 (10 overs) | | Sanjay Manjrekar 44* (78); Dion Nash 1/17 (6 overs) |

India won by 6 wickets
Gandhi Sports Complex Ground, Amritsar
Umpires: Subroto Porel (Ind) and SK Sharma (Ind)
Player of the match: Manoj Prabhakar (Ind)

- India won the toss and elected to field.

=== 3rd ODI ===
21 November
Scorecard

| India | v | New Zealand |

Match abandoned
Fatorda Stadium, Margao
Umpires: Raman Sharma (Ind) and Sekhon (Ind)

- No toss
- Match was abandoned due to rain.

=== 4th ODI ===
24 November
Scorecard

| New Zealand; 235/6 (50 overs) | v | India; 236/5 (45.5 overs) |
| Chris Cairns 103 (87); Sachin Tendulkar 2/49 (9 overs) | | Mohammad Azharuddin 58 (68); Chris Cairns 3/37 (10 overs) |

India won by 5 wickets
Nehru Stadium, Pune
Player of the match: Chris Cairns (NZ)

- India won the toss and elected to field.

=== 5th ODI ===
26 November
Scorecard

| New Zealand; 348/8 (50 overs) | v | India; 249 (39.3 overs) |
| Nathan Astle 114 (128); Anil Kumble 2/48 (10 overs) | | Sachin Tendulkar 65 (59); Shane Thomson 3/63 (9.3 overs) |

New Zealand won by 99 runs
Vidarbha Cricket Association Ground, Nagpur
Umpires: Suresh Shastri (Ind) and Narendra Menon (Ind)
Player of the match: Nathan Astle (NZ)

- India won the toss and elected to field.

=== 6th ODI ===
29 November
Scorecard

| New Zealand; 126 (35 overs) | v | India; 128/4 (32 overs) |
| Lee Germon 29 (51); Anil Kumble 3/17 (8 overs) | | Vinod Kambli 48 (34); Simon Doull 3/42 (6 overs) |

India won by 6 wickets
Brabourne Stadium, Mumbai
Umpires: Ivaturi Shivram (Ind) and Arani Jayaprakash (Ind)
Player of the match: Javagal Srinath (Ind)

- India won the toss and elected to field.
