= Typhoon Kent (1995) =

Pacific typhoon in 1995

Typhoon Kent (Gening)
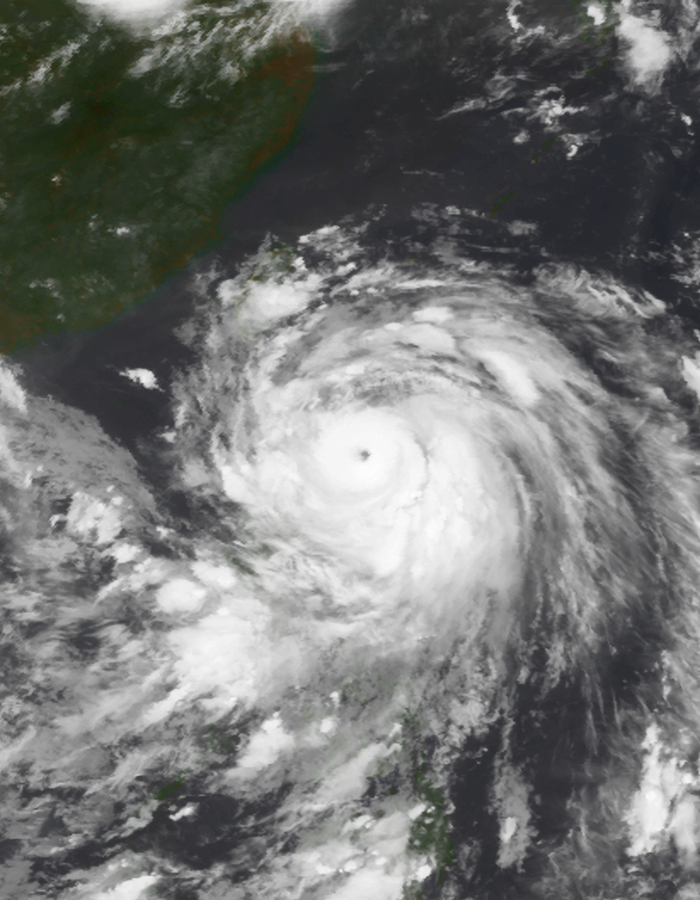
- Typhoon Kent on August 29, 1995

Meteorological history
- Formed: August 24, 1995
- Dissipated: September 1, 1995

Very strong typhoon
- 10-minute sustained (JMA)
- Highest winds: 155 km/h (100 mph)
- Lowest pressure: 945 hPa (mbar); 27.91 inHg

Category 4-equivalent super typhoon
- 1-minute sustained (SSHWS/JTWC)
- Highest winds: 240 km/h (150 mph)
- Lowest pressure: 910 hPa (mbar); 26.87 inHg

Overall effects
- Fatalities: 52 direct
- Damage: $419 million (1995 USD)
- Areas affected: Philippines, Taiwan, Southern China, Hong Kong
- IBTrACS
- Part of the 1995 Pacific typhoon season

Typhoon Kent, known in the Philippines as Typhoon Gening, was a powerful Category 4-equivalent typhoon that formed in late August during the 1995 Pacific typhoon season.

The twelfth tropical cyclone, fourth typhoon and first super typhoon of the 1995 season, Kent formed on August 24 in the western north Pacific and moved westwards where it reached typhoon status on August 26 east of the Philippines. Kent then rapidly strengthened into a super typhoon with winds reaching peak intensity of 150 mph (240 km/h) as it brushed past the northern Philippines and southern Taiwan before making landfall in eastern People's Republic of China on August 31. After making landfall, Kent weakened and dissipated the following day.

A strong and destructive typhoon, Kent left 52 fatalities and $418.9 million (1995 USD, $555 million 2006 USD) in damage in the Philippines, Taiwan and China.

== Meteorological history ==
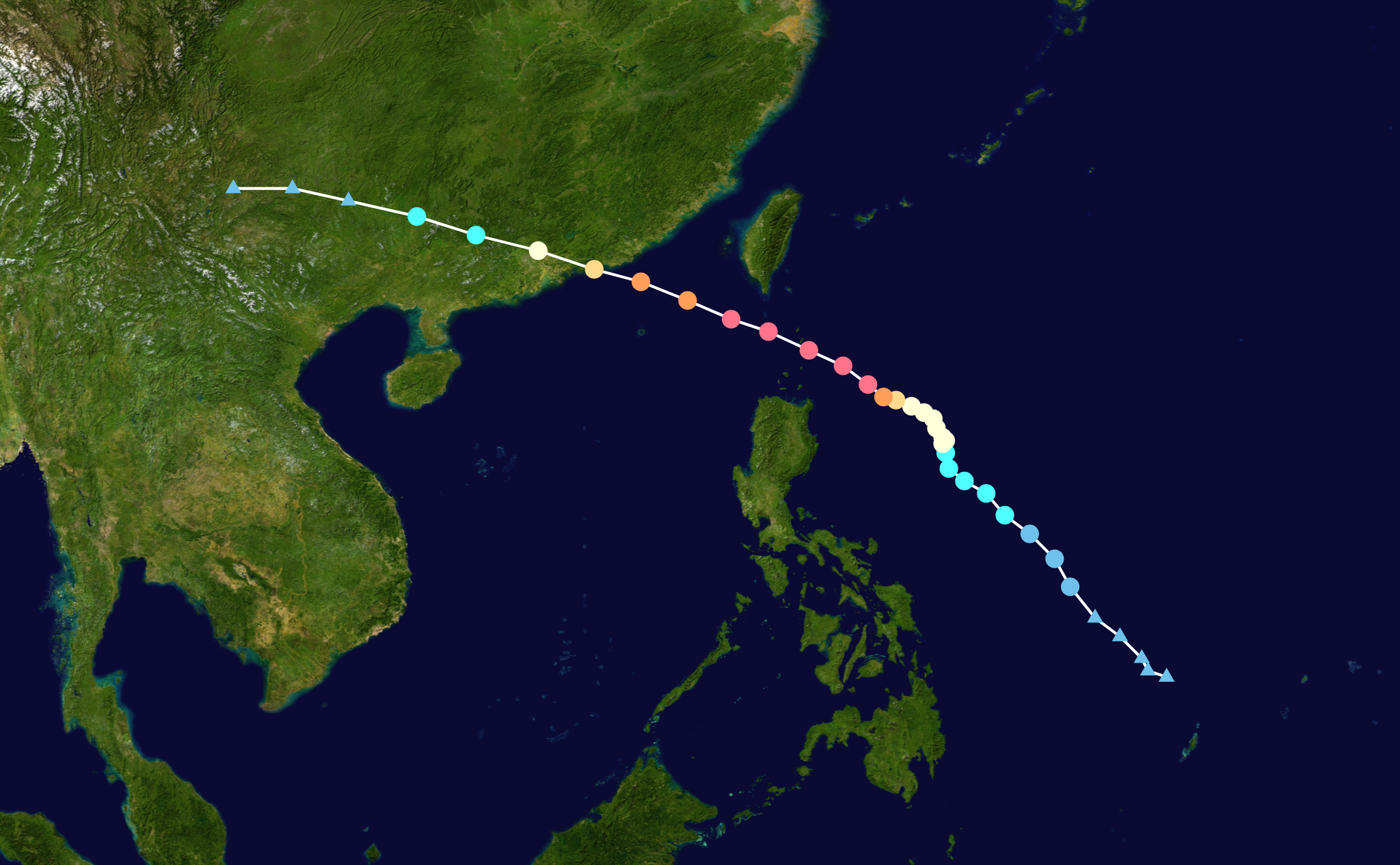
Map plotting the storm's track and intensity, according to the Saffir–Simpson scale Map key Saffir–Simpson scale Tropical depression (≤38 mph, ≤62 km/h) Tropical storm (39–73 mph, 63–118 km/h) Category 1 (74–95 mph, 119–153 km/h) Category 2 (96–110 mph, 154–177 km/h) Category 3 (111–129 mph, 178–208 km/h) Category 4 (130–156 mph, 209–251 km/h) Category 5 (≥157 mph, ≥252 km/h) Unknown Storm type Tropical cyclone Subtropical cyclone Extratropical cyclone, remnant low, tropical disturbance, or monsoon depression

A tropical wave was detected by the Joint Typhoon Warning Center on August 24. 24 hours later while northwest of Palau, the disturbance intensified to be classified as a tropical depression by the Joint Typhoon Warning Center on August 25. The Japan Meteorological Agency (JMA) also upgraded the disturbance to a tropical depression at 1340 UTC. and the Philippine Atmospheric, Geophysical and Astronomical Services Administration (PAGASA) named the depression Gening from its list of pacific typhoon names. Moving northwest, the depression continue to organize and forecasters at the Joint Typhoon Warning Center began to issue a tropical cyclone formation alert (TCFA) on the disturbance at 1130 UTC. On August 26, the tropical depression intensified into a tropical storm and was named Kent by the Joint Typhoon Warning Center.

Kent then quickly intensified into a typhoon on August 27 as it drifted slowly west-northwest. As the storm strengthened, a banding type eye appeared as Kent reached maximum intensity of 150 mph (240 km/h) on August 29 which is Supertyphoon status by JTWC classifications and equivent to a strong Category 4 tropical cyclone on the Saffir–Simpson Hurricane Scale. The storm also reached a low barometric pressure of 945 millibars. The JMA also assessed they typhoon attaining a 10-min peak of 100 mph (160 km/h) Continuing west-northwest, the eye of Typhoon Kent passed over the Philippine island of Basco at 0100 UTC, radar imagery showed the storm undergoing an eyewall replacement cycle as it brushed past. Kent also weakened below super typhoon status as it accelerated towards China. Kent made landfall in China on August 31 50 miles (80 km) northeast of Hong Kong. After landfall, the Joint Typhoon Warning Center issued its final warning on September 1 as Kent dissipated. The Japan Meteorological Agency also issued its final advisory on Kent.

== Preparations ==
In Hong Kong, forecasters at the Royal Observatory issued a Stand by signal number one on August 30 and advised residents to take shelter as Kent neared the coast. On August 31, the forecasters issued a gale warning (storm signal number eight) as the storm neared closer.

== Impact ==
=== Philippines ===
The centre of Typhoon Kent brushed past the island of Batan where a weather station reported a barometric pressure of 945 millibars and 1 minute sustained winds of 135 mph (217 km/h). Kent caused moderate damage in Basco amounting to $2 million (1995 USD, $2.6 million 2006 USD). In Itbayat, the typhoon caused $50,000 (1995 USD, $65,500 2006 USD) in damage. In Luzon the typhoon inflicted the most damage as heavy rainfall caused severe flash flooding that forced 65,000 people to evacuate. The heavy rainfall also caused mudslides that flowed down the sides of Mount Pinatubo that buried small villages. The floodwaters and mudslides forced residents onto rooftops where they were rescued. Five people died in Luzon and over 178,000 people were affected by the flooding brought by Typhoon Kent. The Philippine Government provided relief efforts after the storm.

=== Taiwan ===
Kent caused one fatality and caused moderate flood damage.

=== Hong Kong ===
In Hong Kong, the outer rainbands of Kent brought heavy rains and gale-force winds as the storm approached. Two weather stations in Star Ferry and Lau Fau Shan reported winds of 47–50 mph (76–80 km/h). The RO headquarters reported a barometric pressure of 992 millibars (29.27 inches). The Royal Observatory also reported rainfall of 5.31 inches (135 mm) over a two-day period. Another weather station reported a two-day rainfall total up to 8.31 inches (211 mm), the highest rainfall total was near Kwai Chung where a weather station recorded 8.6 inches (220 mm) of rain. The typhoon caused moderate tree damage and heavy rains caused numerous flood and landslides that blocked roads resulting in numerous road accidents that left five people injured.

=== Southern China ===
The heavy rainfall brought by Kent caused severe flash flooding across southern China. In Guangdong, flood waters damaged or destroyed 40,000 homes, inundated 3,000 km^{2} (1,200 sq mi) of farmland and left 30 people dead. Damage there amounted to 3.2 billion 1995 RMB ($418.9 million 1995 USD, $555.4 million 2006 USD). The typhoon also killed 17 people in Hainan Island.

== See also ==
- Tropical cyclone
- List of notable tropical cyclones
- Tropical cyclones in 1995
- Typhoon Nuri (2008)
- Typhoon Usagi (2013)
- Typhoon Meranti (2016)
- Typhoon Doksuri (2023)
