= List of storms named Felix =

The name Felix was used for five tropical cyclones worldwide, four in the Atlantic Ocean one in the Australian region, as well as for one extratropical European windstorm.

In the Atlantic:

- Hurricane Felix (1989) – Category 1 hurricane that did not threaten land.
- Hurricane Felix (1995) – Category 4 hurricane that passed very near Bermuda.
- Hurricane Felix (2001) – Category 3 hurricane that never threatened land.
- Hurricane Felix (2007) – Category 5 hurricane that made landfall in northern Nicaragua, causing at least 133 deaths and hundreds of millions of dollars in damages in Central America.

The name was retired in the Atlantic Basin after the 2007 season, and was replaced by Fernand for the 2013 season.

In the Australian region:

- Cyclone Felix (1980) - did not affect land.

In Europe:

- Storm Felix (2018)
