= 1995 India cyclone =

Category 1 North Indian tropical cyclone in 1995

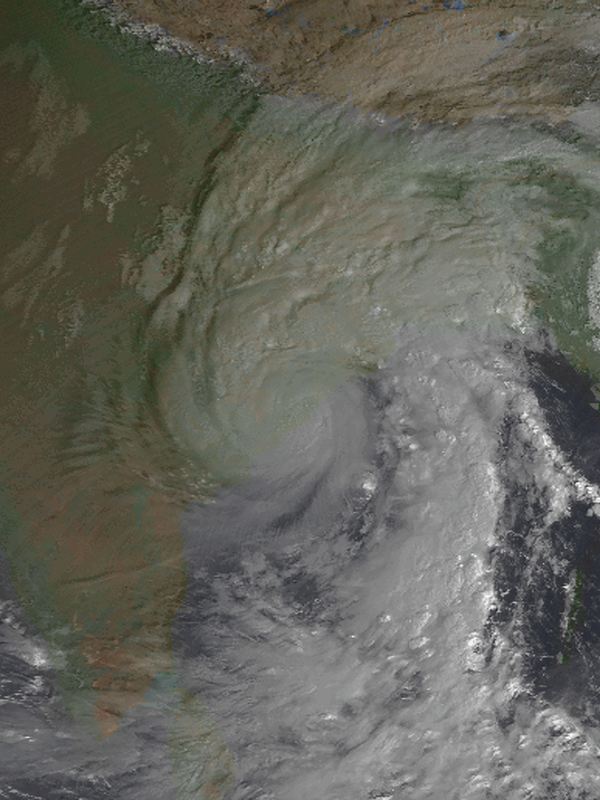
- Satellite image of the storm near landfall

Meteorological history
- Formed: 7 November 1995
- Dissipated: 11 November 1995

Very severe cyclonic storm
- 3-minute sustained (IMD)
- Highest winds: 120 km/h (75 mph)
- Lowest pressure: 978 hPa (mbar); 28.88 inHg

Category 1-equivalent tropical cyclone
- 1-minute sustained (SSHWS/JTWC)
- Highest winds: 130 km/h (80 mph)

Overall effects
- Fatalities: 236 overall
- Damage: $46.3 million (1995 USD)
- Areas affected: India, Bangladesh, Nepal
- IBTrACS
- Part of the 1995 North Indian Ocean cyclone season

The 1995 India cyclone was a tropical cyclone that struck southeastern India which later spawned a rare snowstorm in Nepal, triggering the deadliest mountain trekking incident in the country's history in November 1995. The storm originated from the monsoon trough on 7 November in the Bay of Bengal, east of India, becoming the penultimate storm of the 1995 North Indian Ocean cyclone season. Moving northwestward, the system gradually intensified while moving toward land, eventually developing an eye in the middle of the convection. Reaching peak winds of at least 120 km/h (75 mph), the India Meteorological Department (IMD) classified the system as a very severe cyclonic storm on 8 November, (Note: The India Meteorological Department is the official Regional Specialized Meteorological Center for the northern Indian Ocean.) in line with intensity estimates from the American-based Joint Typhoon Warning Center (JTWC). (Note: The Joint Typhoon Warning Center is a joint United States Navy – United States Air Force task force that issues tropical cyclone warnings for the northern Indian Ocean and other regions.) On 9 November, the cyclone made landfall near the border of Andhra Pradesh and Orissa. A typical for most November storms, the system continued to the north and dissipated over Nepal on 11 November.

In India, the cyclone's strong winds were accompanied by heavy rainfall and a storm surge of 1.5 m (4.9 ft) that inundated the coastline several hundred feet inland. Power lines, crops, and houses were damaged, and many boats were damaged, causing several nautical fatalities. The cyclone killed at least 128 people in India, with hundreds remaining unaccounted for, and damage was estimated at RS$1.1 billion (US$32.2 million). In neighboring Bangladesh, high waves killed 45 people after sinking or sweeping away four ships. The cyclone later spawned a rare November snowstorm across eastern Nepal, with depths reaching 2,000 mm (79 in). The snowfall occurred without warning amid the busy mountain trekking season, and there were several avalanches and landslides across the country. One such incident killed 24 people at a lodge near Gokyo, and there were 63 deaths related to the cyclone in the country. The Nepal government launched the largest search and rescue mission in the country's history, rescuing 450 people, some of whom trapped for days in the snow.

== Meteorological history ==
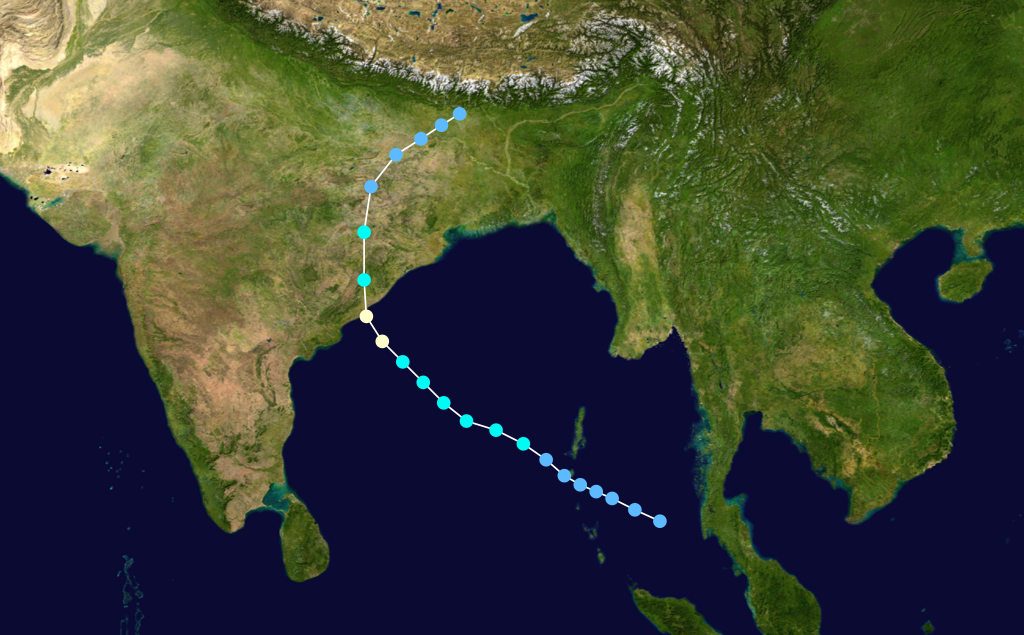
Map plotting the storm's track and intensity, according to the Saffir–Simpson scale Map key Saffir–Simpson scale Tropical depression (≤38 mph, ≤62 km/h) Tropical storm (39–73 mph, 63–118 km/h) Category 1 (74–95 mph, 119–153 km/h) Category 2 (96–110 mph, 154–177 km/h) Category 3 (111–129 mph, 178–208 km/h) Category 4 (130–156 mph, 209–251 km/h) Category 5 (≥157 mph, ≥252 km/h) Unknown Storm type Tropical cyclone Subtropical cyclone Extratropical cyclone, remnant low, tropical disturbance, or monsoon depression

In early November 1995, the monsoon trough was active across the Bay of Bengal, with several associated circulations. A disturbance near the Andaman Islands became the focus of the overall system on 6 November. Located south of the subtropical ridge, the system moved to the west-northwest. Based on the improved organization, the JTWC issued a Tropical Cyclone Formation Alert late on 6 November, and at 00:00 UTC the next day initiated advisories on Tropical Cyclone 03B just west of the Andaman Islands. Six hours later, the IMD likewise classified the system as a depression.

After development, the depression steadily intensified while moving through the Bay of Bengal; rounding the ridge, it accelerated and turned more to the northwest. The IMD upgraded the system to a deep depression by 12:00 UTC on 7 November, and further to a cyclonic storm by 00:00 UTC on the following day. The convection, or thunderstorms, organized into a comma-like structure, which further evolved into a central dense overcast. Intensification was also aided by increased upper-level divergence or the increased upward movement of air. At 09:00 UTC on 8 November, the IMD upgraded the system to a severe cyclonic storm, and six hours later to a very severe cyclonic storm. By that time, an eye had developed, described by the IMD as a "banding-type eye". As such, the agency estimated peak 3 minutes sustained winds of 120 km/h (75 mph). The minimum barometric pressure was estimated at 978 mbar (28.9 inHg). The JTWC estimated slightly higher 1-minute winds of 130 km/h (80 mph).

Around 05:00 UTC on 9 November, the cyclone made landfall at peak intensity in eastern India, near the state borders of Andhra Pradesh and Odisha, and close to the city of Ichchapuram. Although the IMD officially estimated peak winds of 120 km/h (75 mph), winds could have been as high as 150 km/h (95 mph), based on the damage and estimates from the Dvorak technique. After moving ashore, the storm turned more to the north and rapidly weakened over land. By 12:00 UTC on 9 November, the JTWC discontinued advisories. The storm weakened into a depression over the northern Bihar state early on 10 November. On the next day, the system degenerated into a remnant low, by which time the system had turned to the northeast and spread into Nepal. The circulation dissipated, although moisture and convection from the storm spread through Nepal.

== Impact ==
Location in Nepal where avalanche occurred

Moving ashore eastern India, the cyclone brought strong winds, with a peak gust of 115 km/h (70 mph) at the Visakhapatnam Airport, well southwest of the landfall location. Winds in Gopalpur, Odisha were estimated at 130 km/h (80 mph). The lowest barometric pressure in India was 982.1 mbar (29.00 inHg) in Kalingapatnam. The storm produced a storm surge of 1.5 m (4.9 ft), which spread several hundred feet inland. In addition to the winds and surge, the cyclone dropped heavy rainfall along its path, particularly in Andhra Pradesh and Odisha, peaking at over 200 mm (8 in).

Along the Indian coast from Andhra Pradesh to West Bengal, 2,688 boats were damaged, accounting for 48 fishermen deaths in Visakhapatnam alone. An Indian Coast Guard ship was washed ashore near Bhubaneswar, trapping the crew inside until they were rescued. In Andhra Pradesh, the high winds damaged 21 km (13 mi) of power lines, affecting 12,733 electrical units. The storm damaged 27,945 houses, mostly in Orissa. In the state, the storm's high winds and rainfall wrecked stalls for a festival in Paradip, and raining out two days play of a Test cricket match in Cuttack between India and New Zealand. There was also widespread crop damage on 11,043,653 ha (27,289,460 acres) of crop fields. In West Bengal, paddy crops, mustard trees, and potatoes were damaged. Throughout India, the cyclone killed 73 people, with 402 people missing after the storm. The International Disaster Database indicated that the storm killed 128 people and caused US$46.3 million in damage.

Farther east, officials in Bangladesh evacuated residents along offshore islands, while boats were ordered to return to the coast. The storm ultimately produced 60 to 80 km/h (37 to 50 mph) winds along with heavy rainfall in the country. High seas, reaching 5.5 m (18 ft) in height, capsized a boat in the Chunkuri River and left three other boats missing, killing 45 people. The waves also flooded about 3,000 ha (7,400 acres) of crop fields.

Atypical for November, the storm continued northward and became the most intense cyclone to affect Nepal in the autumn in 50 years. The country's Department of Meteorology did not issue warnings for the storm, as no mountain trekking teams requested a forecast. As a result, many mountain climbers and guides were caught off guard, and thousands of mountaineers from around the world were in the region when the cyclone struck. When the energy from the storm spread into the Himalayan Mountains of Nepal, a process known as orographic lift occurred, whereby the moisture coalesced in mountainous regions. At elevations generally below 3,500 m (11,500 ft), the precipitation resulted in 50 to 200 mm (2.0 to 7.9 in) of rainfall, reaching 220 mm (8.7 in) in Dhankuta. In some areas, totals were 3,000% of the average November rainfall, which is usually a dry month. At higher elevations, the precipitation caused intense snowfall, reaching up to 2,000 mm (79 in) deep in Dingboche. Gorakshep recorded 1,200 mm (47 in) of snowfall. The Khumbu region of eastern Nepal received rare snowfall, as it is normally part of a rain shadow. The village of Thame was buried for eight days until people could travel freely again; the rarity of the snowfall meant that residents did not have skis or snow shoes. By 14 November, or five days after the arrival of the storm, the snow had receded.

The heavy snowfall across Nepal produced landslides and avalanches, mostly on 10 November and into the following day. Near Gokyo, two avalanches combined and destroyed a lodge housing 25 mountain climbers, killing all but one; the survivor was rescued after being trapped for 40 hours. The hikers were climbing Gokyo Ri, a mountain 18 km (11 mi) southeast of Mount Everest. This marked the deadliest avalanche in Nepal to affect a hiking expedition. Another avalanche killed seven people in Kangchenjunga. With levels reaching as high as the roofs of houses, the heavy snowfall damaged the roofs of several buildings, including one school, and killed about 100 animals. Across the country, the storm killed 63 people, 33 of them related to avalanches, including 22 foreigners, although the Trekking Workers' Association believed the death toll was higher. Several of the deaths were the result of collapsed houses, while others were the result of people freezing to death. The Mani Rimdu festival likely prevented additional deaths, as over 1,000 residents in the hardest hit areas left for the ceremony. After the snowfall, the Nepal government coordinated the largest search and rescue mission in the country's history, utilizing helicopters to rescue 450 stranded people, encompassing an area of 600 km^{2} (230 mi^{2}), before the mission was ended on 15 November. Several of the rescued people required medical attention. Stranded victims had to stay in the snow for a day and a half before being spotted and rescued, and inclement weather disrupted efforts.

== See also ==
- Cyclone Hudhud – powerful cyclone in 2014 that also spawned snowfall and deadly avalanches in Nepal
