= Hurricane Felix (1995) =

Category 4 Atlantic hurricane

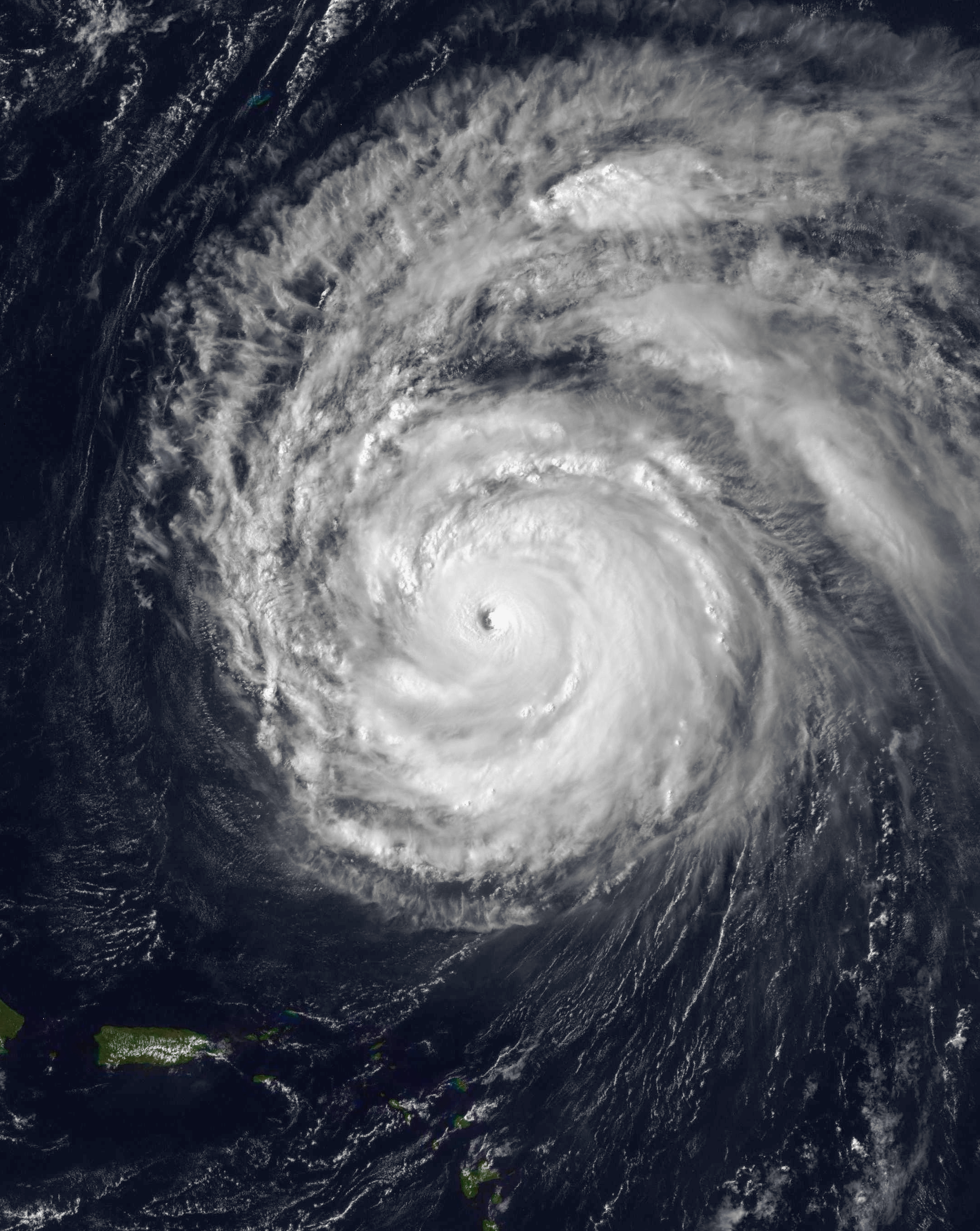
- Felix near peak intensity north of the Leeward Islands on August 12

Meteorological history
- Formed: August 8, 1995
- Extratropical: August 22, 1995
- Dissipated: August 25, 1995

Category 4 major hurricane
- 1-minute sustained (SSHWS/NWS)
- Highest winds: 140 mph (220 km/h)
- Lowest pressure: 929 mbar (hPa); 27.43 inHg

Overall effects
- Fatalities: 9 direct
- Damage: $3.63 million (1995 USD)
- Areas affected: Puerto Rico, Bermuda, East Coast of the United States, Atlantic Canada, Iceland, United Kingdom
- IBTrACS
- Part of the 1995 Atlantic hurricane season

Hurricane Felix caused severe beach erosion along the East Coast of the United States in August 1995. Felix was also the strongest hurricane in the Atlantic Ocean since Hurricane Andrew in 1992. The seventh tropical cyclone, sixth named storm, and third hurricane of the 1995 Atlantic hurricane season, Felix developed from a tropical wave in the eastern Atlantic Ocean on August 8, and slowly intensified, reaching hurricane status on August 11. Under favorable conditions, Felix began to rapidly deepen while curving northwestward. Late on August 12, Felix peaked as a low-end Category 4 hurricane. However, it soon weakened rapidly to a Category 1 hurricane. Less than three days later, Felix passed only 75 mi (120 km) southeast of Bermuda. Although it also posed a threat to the East Coast of the United States, Felix curved northward and then east-northeastward while remaining offshore, thereby avoiding landfall. Felix briefly threatened Bermuda again, but weakened to a tropical storm and turned back to the northeast on August 20. It accelerated east-northeastward, and passed a short distance offshore of Newfoundland, where Felix transitioned into an extratropical storm on August 22.

Large waves in Puerto Rico caused minor coastal flooding in Cataño. Near-hurricane-force winds in Bermuda downed trees and power lines, which left 20,000 people without power. Rough surf on the island damaged a few boats and hotels. In addition, the passage of Felix postponed Bermuda's 1995 independence referendum. Large waves produced by the storm affected nearly the entire East Coast of the United States. In New York, two houses were washed away in The Hamptons, and two boats capsized in Maine. While passing southeast of Newfoundland, Felix produced moderate rainfall and large waves across the island, although damage was minimal. Overall, Felix caused nine deaths due to drowning along the coasts of Rhode Island, New Jersey, and North Carolina. The storm did approximately $2.5 million (1995 USD) in damage on Bermuda, while rough seas produced about $132,000 in losses along the United States coastline.

== Meteorological history ==
Map plotting the storm's track and intensity, according to the Saffir–Simpson scale Map key Saffir–Simpson scale Tropical depression (≤38 mph, ≤62 km/h) Tropical storm (39–73 mph, 63–118 km/h) Category 1 (74–95 mph, 119–153 km/h) Category 2 (96–110 mph, 154–177 km/h) Category 3 (111–129 mph, 178–208 km/h) Category 4 (130–156 mph, 209–251 km/h) Category 5 (≥157 mph, ≥252 km/h) Unknown Storm type Tropical cyclone Subtropical cyclone Extratropical cyclone, remnant low, tropical disturbance, or monsoon depression

A tropical wave exited the west coast of Africa on August 6, and quickly showed signs of a developing circulation. After an increase in convection, or thunderstorms, the National Hurricane Center (NHC) classified the system as Tropical Depression Seven at 0000 UTC on August 8, about 460 mi (740 km) west-southwest of the Cape Verde islands. With a strong ridge to the north, the nascent depression moved generally west-northwestward, and the combination of favorable upper-level conditions and warm sea surface temperatures allowed for gradual intensification. About 18 hours after the depression formed, the NHC upgraded it to Tropical Storm Felix. By August 9, the storm had developed a large area of convection with associated outflow. After continuing to slowly intensify, Felix became a hurricane early on August 11 about 575 mi (925 km) east of the Lesser Antilles.

Soon after becoming a hurricane, Felix developed a well-defined eye as Hurricane Hunters began investigating the storm. Beginning at 1200 UTC on August 11, the hurricane began undergoing rapid deepening, and by the next day, concentric eyewalls were observed, indicative of a strong storm. On August 12, the Hurricane Hunters observed flight-level winds of 164 mph (264 km/h), suggesting peak surface winds of 140 mph (220 km/h). At that time, Felix was located north of the Lesser Antilles, moving to the north-northwest due to an approaching trough weakening the ridge. After peak winds, Felix weakened due to stronger wind shear and its eyewall replacement cycle. The eye became indistinct and opened on August 13, and it became a minimal hurricane by August 14 with a broad inner core. Late on August 14, Hurricane Felix turned more to the west-northwest, after the trough that previously brought it northward split into two pieces of energy, one moving southward and the other moving northeastward. On August 15, the hurricane passed about 75 mi (120 km) south of Bermuda, and a building ridge was anticipated to allow Felix to continue its trajectory toward North Carolina.

Beginning on August 15, the NHC began forecasting that the hurricane would make landfall on the Outer Banks of North Carolina within two days. Early on August 16, the eye became better defined, although the feature diminished within a few hours, and the NHC was on the verge of downgrading Felix to tropical storm status. A break in the ridge allowed Felix to turn to the north, bringing it about 150 mi (250 km) east of the Outer Banks. An approaching trough turned the hurricane to a northeast drift, and there was initial uncertainty whether Felix would loop back to the west or recurve to the northeast. During this time, the system remained a minimal hurricane, maintaining a large eye about 60 to 80 miles (95 to 130 km) in diameter, but with weak convection due to cooler air. After the trough that turned Felix to the east-northeast bypassed it to the north, the hurricane turned to the southeast, executing a small loop while northwest of Bermuda. On August 20, Felix weakened below hurricane intensity for the first time in nine days, due to cooler waters and increased wind shear. By that time, the convection was removed from the center, and another trough brought the storm to the northeast. While passing east of Newfoundland on August 22, Felix became extratropical. The remnants continued to the northeast, eventually passing north of the United Kingdom on August 25.

== Preparations ==
While Felix was near peak intensity on August 12, officials in Bermuda issued a hurricane watch for the island. A tropical storm warning was added the next day, which was upgraded to a hurricane warning on August 14. The warnings were downgraded to a tropical storm warning and later discontinued after the hurricane bypassed the island. A tropical storm watch was later issued for Bermuda on August 19 late in Felix's duration when it was drifting offshore the eastern United States. The threat of the storm caused flights to be canceled to and from the island.

Initial forecasts predicted a landfall on the Outer Banks of North Carolina, with winds of 100 mph (160 km/h); however, these forecasts were made with great uncertainty. While Felix was still near Bermuda on August 15, the NHC issued hurricane warnings for the eastern United States from Little River, South Carolina to Chincoteague, Virginia and including the Pamlico Sound, Albemarle Sound, and southern portions of the Chesapeake Bay. Tropical storm warnings were also issued from Chincoteague to near Manasquan, New Jersey, including the Chesapeake and Delaware bays. The watches and warnings remained in place until August 18. Despite the lack of landfall, the NHC deemed the watches and warnings as appropriate due to the projected track.

The threat of the storm caused officials to issue evacuation orders for the Outer Banks of North Carolina, and about 200,000 people left the island chain, including 125,000 in Dare County. Evacuation orders were dropped and shelters were closed as the storm moved away. The loss of tourism revenue was estimated at $1.2 million in Currituck County alone, and the loss of revenue for businesses in the Outer Banks was estimated at $4 million (1995 USD) per day during the evacuations. Some people in Virginia Beach, Virginia also evacuated voluntarily. The storm delayed a search for the remains of the Civil War steamship USS Monitor off the coast of North Carolina. The United States Navy moved ships from Norfolk Naval Base to open waters to prevent damage along the docks from the high waves. Then-Virginia governor George Allen declared a state of emergency due to the threat from the hurricane.

== Impact ==
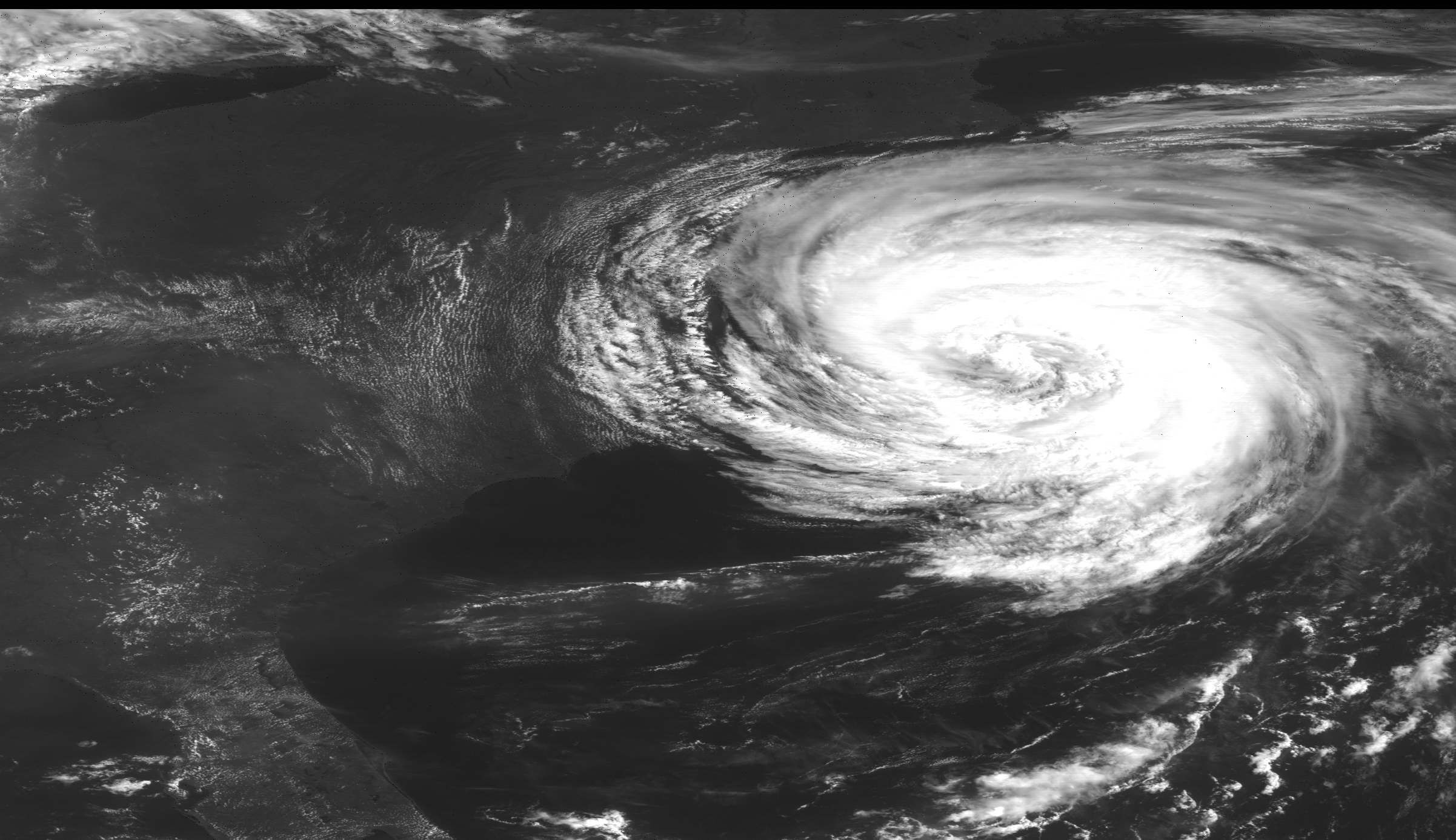
Felix off the coast of North Carolina

Though Felix did not make landfall, its large circulation created large swells across much of the western Atlantic Ocean. In Puerto Rico, 8 to 12 ft (2.4 to 3.7 m) waves caused minor coastal flooding in Cataño.

While passing south of Bermuda, Felix produced sustained winds of 63 mph (102 km/h) with gusts to 80 mph (129 km/h). The winds were strong enough to knock down trees and leave 20,000 people without power, although most outages were quickly restored. Television service was also interrupted. The storm also destroyed a few fishing boats and damaged hotels along the island's southern shore, where prolonged high surf caused considerable beach erosion. The Causeway connecting St. David's Island with the mainland sustained some damage, contributing to an estimated $2.5 million in losses on Bermuda. The hurricane's passage postponed the scheduled vote for Bermuda's independence.

While offshore the eastern United States, Hurricane Felix generated strong waves and rip currents that caused widespread coastal flooding and beach erosion, reaching as far south as Georgia and as far north as Maine. In North Carolina, high waves flooded high waves covered North Carolina Highway 12 during high tides, and three people were killed. Felix passed close enough to the state to produce wind gusts of 43 mph (68 mph) in Buxton, which caused minor property damage, estimated at $57,000 (1995 USD). In some portions of North Carolina, the storm increased beaches due to the displacement of sand, including Long Beach which grew by 5 ft (1.5 m). Beaches along the Outer Banks and Virginia were closed for several days, and about 200 people required rescue in New Hanover County, North Carolina. The Wakefield, Virginia National Weather Service likened the storm's effects to "a strong nor'easter", with little damage in southeastern Virginia. In the months after the storm, beach nourishment occurred along the Outer Banks to repair the eroded coastlines, while in Virginia Beach.

The onshore flow from the hurricane disrupted a heat wave in Delaware and Maryland, while the rough surf caused beach erosion and beach closures. Several people were injured in New Jersey by the rough surf, and over 150 people required rescue in Cape May. Waves of 10 ft (3.0 m) in Atlantic City forced beaches to close for the first time since Hurricane Gloria in 1985, and beaches were closed across the region for about five days. There was minor tidal flooding in the state due to astronomically low tides, although extensive beach erosion occurred after a week of strong waves; in Ocean City, the storm eroded about 240 ft (73 m) of beaches, leaving behind 10 ft (3.0 m) cliffs. Five people drowned in the state due to rough surf. While still offshore, Felix produced wind gusts of 36 mph (57 km/h) in Atlantic City. On Fire Island in New York, the waves washed away two houses. In Rhode Island, 6 to 10 ft (1.8 to 3.0 m) waves overturned a boat along the Sakonnet River, killing one passenger. Along Martha's Vineyard in Massachusetts, waves reached 15 ft (4.6 m), and several beaches were closed across the state. In Maine on Bailey Island, a woman required rescue after being swept away by a wave, who became hypothermic and injured due to cuts. Two lobster boats sank in the state, with one occupant requiring rescue and the other swimming ashore. Damage to the boats totaled $75,000 (1995 USD).

As Hurricane Felix was looping offshore the eastern United States, it produced swells of 26 ft (8 m) along the Nova Scotia coast on an otherwise sunny day. Beaches were closed. Buoys near the Newfoundland coast recorded wave heights of 49 ft (15 m), while buoys farther offshore reported wave heights of 82 ft (27.5 m). The outer rainbands of the storm dropped light rainfall, peaking at around 3.43 mm (87 mm) in northern Newfoundland. Offshore Caithness in Scotland, waves from the remnants of Felix submerged an experimental wave power station, damaging it further after previous waves damaged the system.

== See also ==
- Other storms of the same name
- List of Bermuda hurricanes
- List of North Carolina hurricanes (1980–1999)
- List of New Jersey hurricanes
- Hurricane Edouard (1996) - similar hurricane the following year that threatened the eastern United States, but remained offshore
- Hurricane Jose (2017)
