= 1995 North Indian Ocean cyclone season =

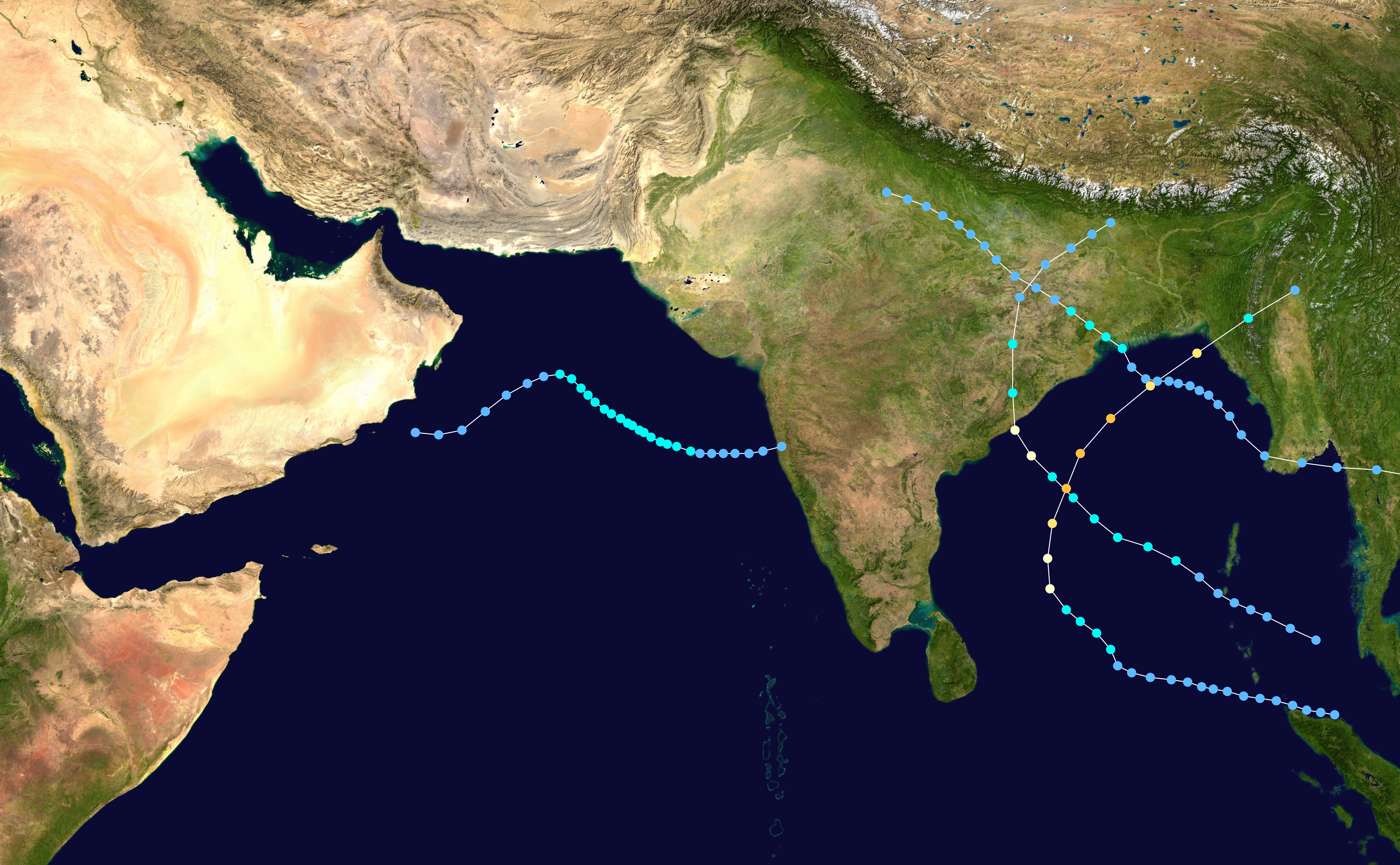
- Season summary map

Seasonal boundaries
- First system formed: May 6, 1995
- Last system dissipated: November 25, 1995

Strongest storm
- Name: BOB 07
  - Maximum winds: 190 km/h (115 mph) (3-minute sustained)
  - Lowest pressure: 956 hPa (mbar)

Seasonal statistics
- Depressions: 8
- Deep depressions: 6
- Cyclonic storms: 3
- Severe cyclonic storms: 2
- Very severe cyclonic storms: 2
- Extremely severe cyclonic storms: 1
- Super cyclonic storms: 0
- Total fatalities: 554
- Total damage: $46.3 million (1995 USD)

Related articles
- 1995 Atlantic hurricane season; 1995 Pacific hurricane season; 1995 Pacific typhoon season

The 1995 North Indian Ocean cyclone season was below-average and was primarily confined to the autumn months, with the exception of three short-lived deep depressions in May. There were eight depressions in the basin, which is Indian Ocean north of the equator. The basin is subdivided between the Bay of Bengal and the Arabian Sea on the east and west coasts of India, respectively. Storms were tracked by the India Meteorological Department (IMD), which is the basin's Regional Specialized Meteorological Center, as well as the American-based Joint Typhoon Warning Center (JTWC) on an unofficial basis.

Tropical activity was largely affected by the monsoon trough, which spawned the three deep depressions in May, as well as the two strongest cyclones in November. The first storm of the season formed on May 5 in the Bay of Bengal, the same location as two additional depressions later in the month. Collectively, the three systems killed 146 people, mostly related to the third system which produced a deadly storm surge in Bangladesh. After two weak depressions in September, the season's lone Arabian Sea storm developed on October 12, and remained largely away from land. The final two storms of the season were the most notable. On November 10, a cyclone struck southeastern India, killing 173 people in India and Bangladesh. Its remnants produced a rare snowstorm in eastern Nepal that caused landslides and avalanches, killing 63. The last storm of the season was also the most powerful, causing 172 deaths when it struck southeastern Bangladesh.

== Season summary ==
The India Meteorological Department (IMD) in New Delhi – the official Regional Specialized Meteorological Center for the northern Indian Ocean as recognized by the World Meteorological Organization – issued warnings for tropical cyclones developing in the region, using satellite imagery and surface data to assess and predict storms. The agency also utilized a tropical cyclone forecast model that used climatology and a storm's persistence to forecast future movement. Warnings and advisories were broadcast throughout India by telegraph and news media. The basin's activity is sub-divided between the Arabian Sea and the Bay of Bengal on opposite coasts of India, and is generally split before and after the monsoon season. Storms were also tracked on an unofficial basis by the American-based Joint Typhoon Warning Center.

The JTWC only tracked the longer-lived and stronger cyclonic storms, which all formed after September; by their assessment, this was the fifth such occurrence since 1975 where all storms developed in the autumn. Throughout the year, tropical systems generally lasted longer than in 1994. The systems that affected land generally struck Andhra Pradesh and eastward through Bangladesh. The three cyclonic storms was less than the average of 5.4, and the two severe cyclonic storms was slightly below the average of 2.5. In addition to the storms tracked by the IMD, a monsoon depression struck northern Oman in late July, producing heavy rainfall that totaled 300 mm (12 in) on Jebel Shams mountain. The system later affected the remainder of the Arabian Peninsula.

== Systems ==
=== May deep depressions ===
During two weeks in the middle of May, a series of three deep depressions developed in unusual succession in the western Bay of Bengal.

The series of storms helped end a drought in eastern India by bringing heavy monsoonal rainfall. The first system brought heavy rainfall to Tamil Nadu and neighboring Andhra Pradesh, while the second storm mainly dropped rainfall in the latter state. The third system brought precipitation to Odisha, West Bengal, and Bangladesh; Bhubaneswar in Odisha reported 567 mm (22.3 in) of rainfall over six days. The rains resulted in flooding and damages to crops, while wrecking dozens of homes. Collectively, the storms killed 86 people in India.

In Bangladesh, the third storm produced a 3 m (10 ft) storm surge and heavy rainfall, reaching 147 mm (5.8 in) over 24 hours in Chittagong. About 100,000 people evacuated their houses to storm shelters due to the floods, while another 100,000 were stranded in their homes due to floods. Many embankment dams were damaged, furthering flooding. On Hatia Island, the storm wrecked over 5,000 homes and 10,000 ha (25,000 acres) of crops, with salt and shrimp farms in the region also destroyed. A 1.8 m (6 ft) storm tide flooded dozens of villages around Cox's Bazar, destroying about 1,000 houses. Two bridges were destroyed, severing traffic between Cox's Bazar and Chittagong. In the latter city, 20,125 houses were damaged or destroyed. Over 60,000 people were left homeless in the country, and there were 60 deaths related to the storm. However, the rains also helped end a damaging five-month drought in the country. The government provided wheat and cash to affected residents to help cope with the disaster. After the storm moved through the area, most freshwater ponds were intruded by saltwater, furthering damage to crops and causing a shortage of drinking water. About 50,000 people became ill after drinking contaminated water, killing around 400 people due to a diarrhea outbreak.

=== Deep Depression BOB 01 ===
- Deep depression (IMD)
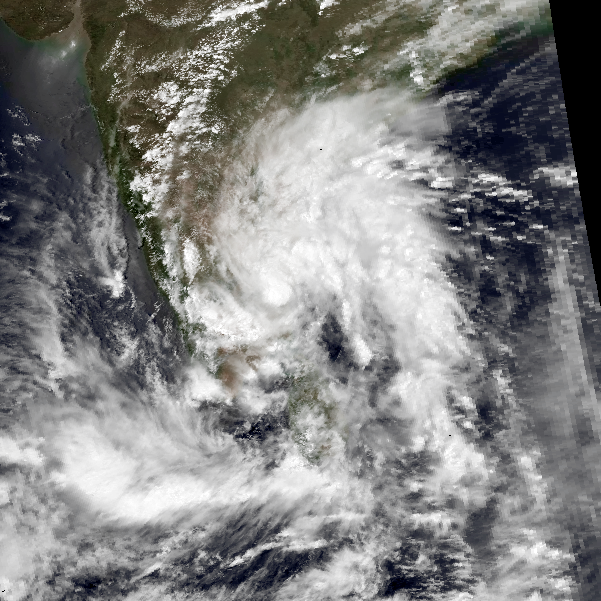
- Duration: May 5 – May 7
- Peak intensity: 55 km/h (35 mph) (3-min);

Originating from the monsoon trough, a low-pressure area formed just north of Sri Lanka on May 5. By 21:00 UTC that night, the system organized into a depression while moving west-northwestward toward India. It developed a central dense overcast of deep convection, prompting the IMD to upgrade it to a 55 km/h (35 mph) deep depression. Still associated with the monsoon, the system had several small circulations and gale-force winds. At 11:00 UTC on May 6, the system moved ashore Tamil Nadu near Cuddalore, and by the next day degenerated into a remnant low.

=== Deep Depression BOB 02 ===
- Deep depression (IMD)
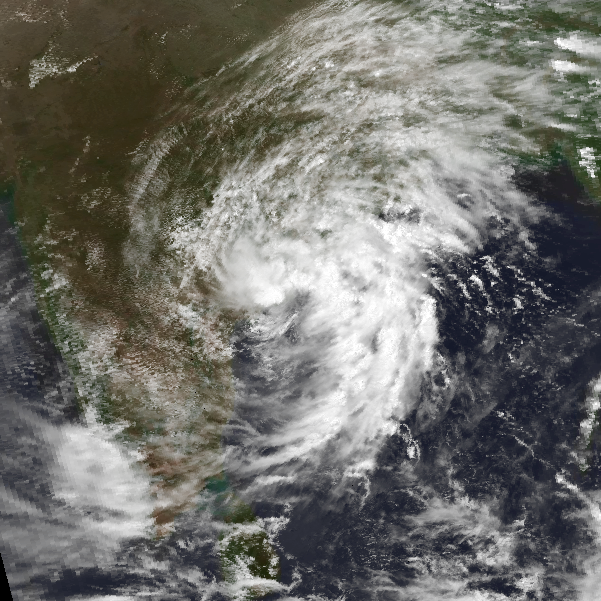
- Duration: May 8 – May 10
- Peak intensity: 55 km/h (35 mph) (3-min);

The second deep depression formed on May 8 about 120 km (75 mi) southeast of the Andhra Pradesh coastline, north of the previous system. It moved to the northeast, intensifying into a 55 km/h (35 mph) deep depression on May 9. At 17:00 UTC that day, the system struck Andhra Pradesh near Tuni as it progressed northward, degenerating into a remnant low on May 10.

=== Deep Depression BOB 03 ===
- Deep depression (IMD)
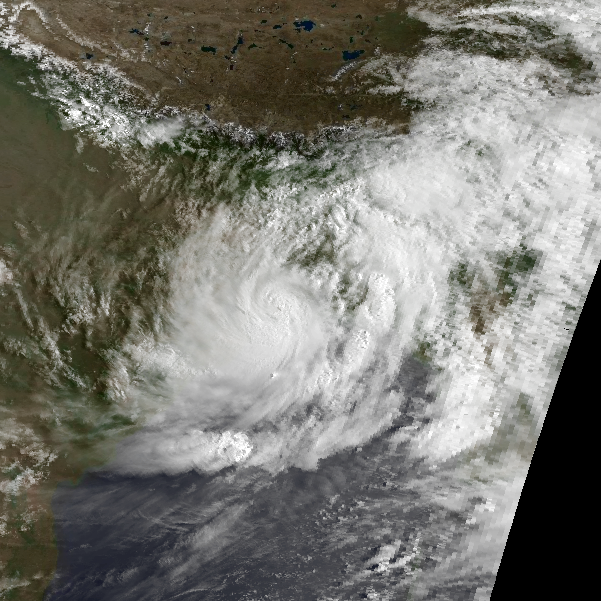
- Duration: May 14 – May 18
- Peak intensity: 55 km/h (35 mph) (3-min);

The third deep depression was also the longest lasting. It formed on May 14 off the coast of Odisha, northeast of the previous system. Moving parallel to the coast, it also intensified into a 55 km/h (35 mph) deep depression on May 15. Early the next day, the system made landfall on Sagar Island in West Bengal state, and weakened while progressing northeastward into Bangladesh. On May 18, the depression was downgraded to a remnant low over Assam state.

=== Depression BOB 04 (01B) ===
- Depression (IMD)
- Tropical storm (SSHWS)
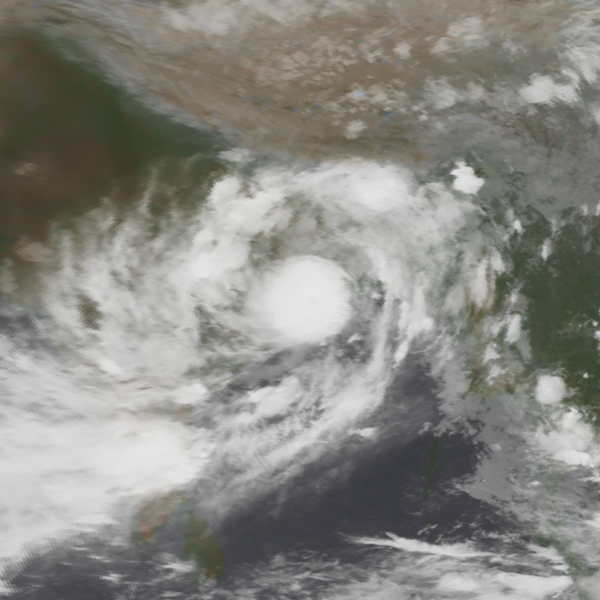
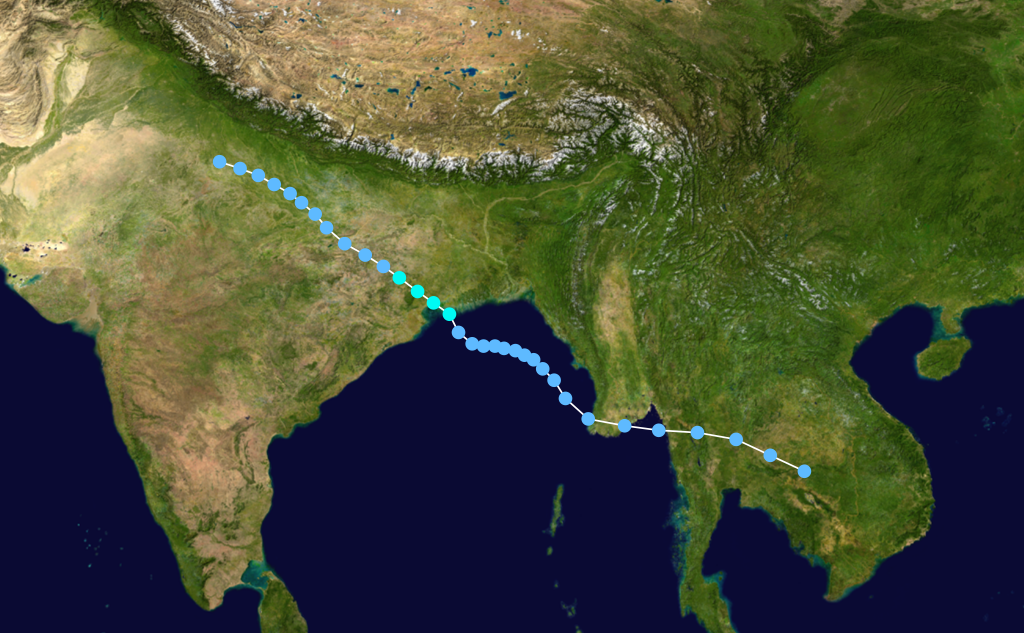
- Duration: September 15 – September 17
- Peak intensity: 45 km/h (30 mph) (3-min); 998 hPa (mbar)

On September 9, a tropical depression formed in the South China Sea in the west Pacific basin. Two days later, the system struck Vietnam and progressed westward through Indochina. The remnants entered the Bay of Bengal around September 13, accompanied by increasing convection. Moving to the west-northwest, the system resembled a monsoon depression at times, although the thunderstorms gradually became more concentrated. On September 16, the system developed into a depression, and on the same day the JTWC classified it as Tropical Cyclone 01B. As the system approached the Indian coastline, it developed good outflow, and was intensifying quickly. The JTWC estimated peak 1 minute winds of 85 km/h (55 mph) at 18:00 UTC on September 16. However, the IMD never assessed winds beyond 45 km/h (30 mph). Around 01:00 UTC on September 17, the depression moved ashore India near Balasore, Odisha. That night, the system degenerated into a remnant low over Bihar, although the remnants persisted until September 20, when they dissipated near Delhi. The depression brought heavy rainfall over Odisha and Bihar.

=== Cyclonic Storm BOB 05 ===
- Cyclonic storm (IMD)
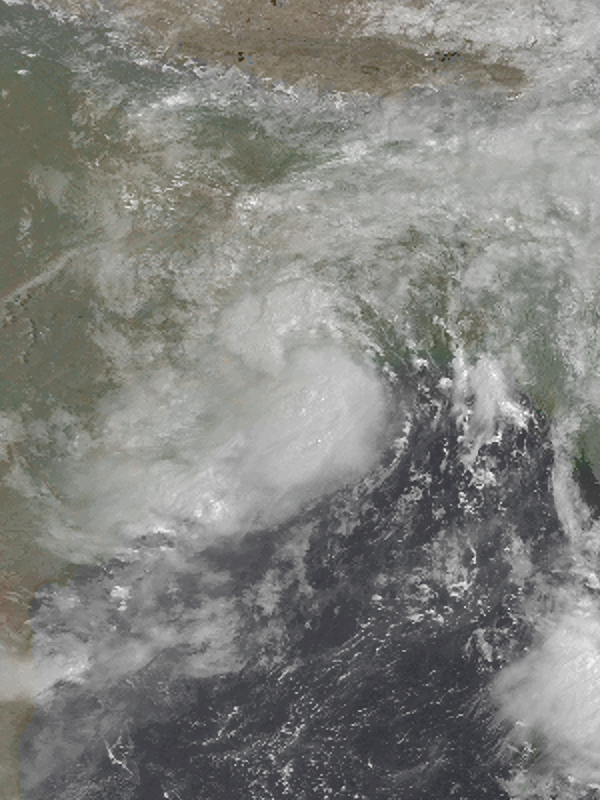
- Duration: September 26 – September 28
- Peak intensity: 85 km/h (50 mph) (3-min);

Later in September, another depression formed on September 26 in the northwestern Bay of Bengal. Moving northwestward, it quickly moved ashore near Balasore, Odisha, failing to intensify beyond winds of 85 km/h (55 mph). A ridge turned the system to the northeast, and the depression dissipated on September 28 over West Bengal. The depression brought heavy rainfall to Odisha, Bihar, and West Bengal, peaking at 570 mm (22 in) in Malda district in West Bengal.

=== Cyclonic Storm ARB 01 (02A) ===
- Cyclonic storm (IMD)
- Tropical storm (SSHWS)
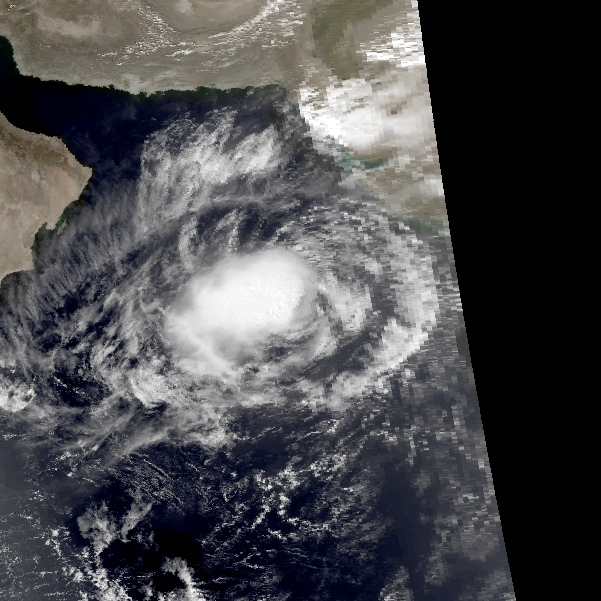
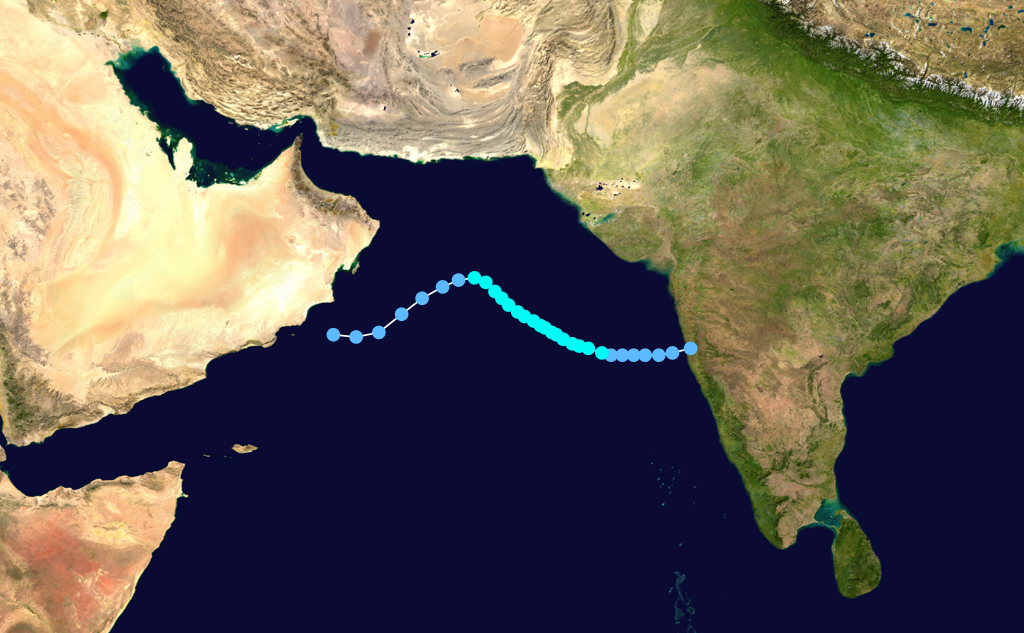
- Duration: October 13 – October 17
- Peak intensity: 85 km/h (50 mph) (3-min); 996 hPa (mbar)

A low-pressure area accompanied by a well-defined circulation persisted over central India on October 11. By the following day, the system emerged into the Arabian Sea, whereupon its convection organized west of a sheared circulation. On October 12, the system organized into a depression, classified Tropical Cyclone 02A by the JTWC. Steered by a ridge, it moved to the west-northwest and gradually intensified. The IMD upgraded it to a cyclonic storm on October 14, estimating peak 3 minute winds of 85 km/h (55 mph). The JTWC assessed slightly higher 1 minute winds of 95 km/h (60 mph). Increased wind shear stripped away the convection, causing the storm to weaken. By October 17, the system deteriorated into a depression and began drifting to the southwest, having moved between two ridges. Later that day, the system degenerated into a remnant low, which the JTWC tracked for an additional day until dissipation east of the Somalia coastline.

=== Very Severe Cyclonic Storm BOB 06 (03B) ===
- Very severe cyclonic storm (IMD)
- Category 1 tropical cyclone (SSHWS)
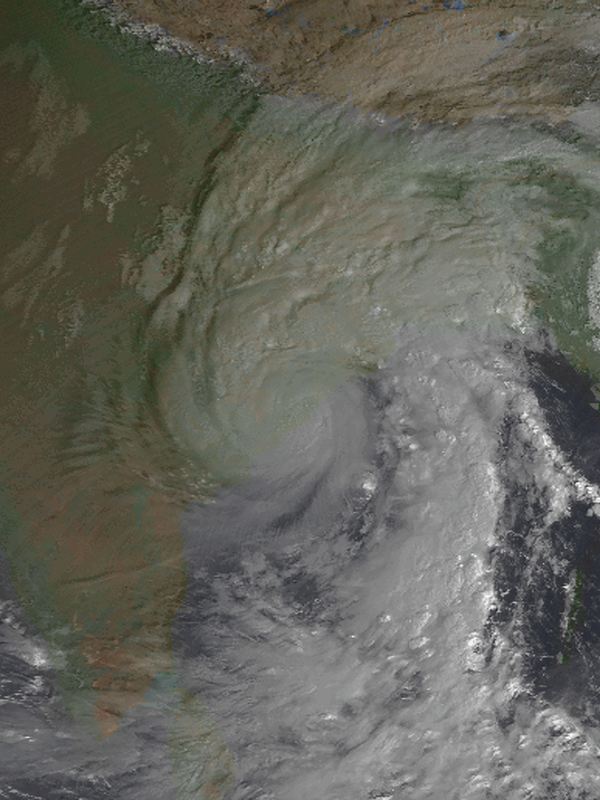
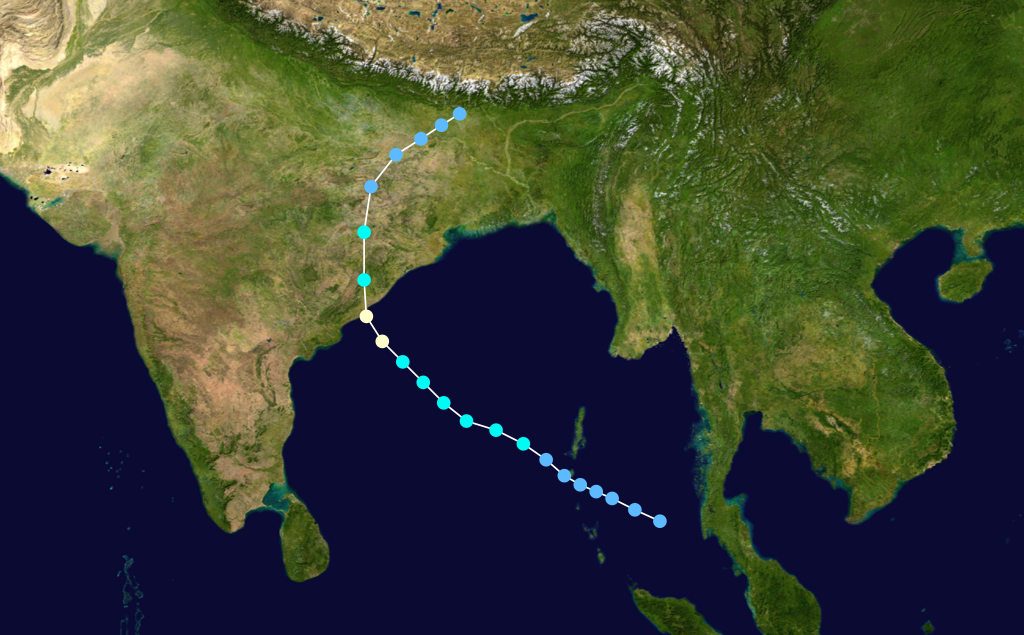
- Duration: November 6 – November 10
- Peak intensity: 120 km/h (75 mph) (3-min); 984 hPa (mbar)

The storm originated from the monsoon trough on November 7 in the Bay of Bengal, east of India. Moving northwestward, the system gradually intensified while moving toward land, eventually developing an eye in the middle of the convection. Reaching peak 3 minute winds of 120 km/h (75 mph), the IMD classified the system as a very severe cyclonic storm, in line with the 130 km/h (80 mph) wind estimate from the JTWC. On November 9, the cyclone made landfall near the border of Andhra Pradesh and Orissa. Atypical for most November storms, the system continued to the north and dissipated over Nepal on November 11.

In India, the cyclone's strong winds were accompanied by heavy rainfall and a storm surge of 1.5 m (4.9 ft) that inundated the coastline several hundred feet inland. Power lines, crops, and houses were damaged, and many boats were damaged, causing several nautical fatalities. The cyclone killed 128 people and caused US$46.3 million in damage. In neighboring Bangladesh, high waves killed 45 people after sinking or sweeping away four ships. The cyclone later spawned a rare November snowstorm across eastern Nepal, with depths reaching 2,000 mm (79 in). The snowfall occurred without warning amid the busy mountain trekking season, and there were several avalanches and landslides across the country. One such incident killed 24 people at a lodge near Gokyo, and there were 63 deaths related to the cyclone in the country. The Nepal government launched the largest search and rescue mission in the country's history, rescuing 450 people, some of whom trapped for days in the snow.

=== Extremely Severe Cyclonic Storm BOB 07 (04B) ===
- Extremely severe cyclonic storm (IMD)
- Category 3 tropical cyclone (SSHWS)
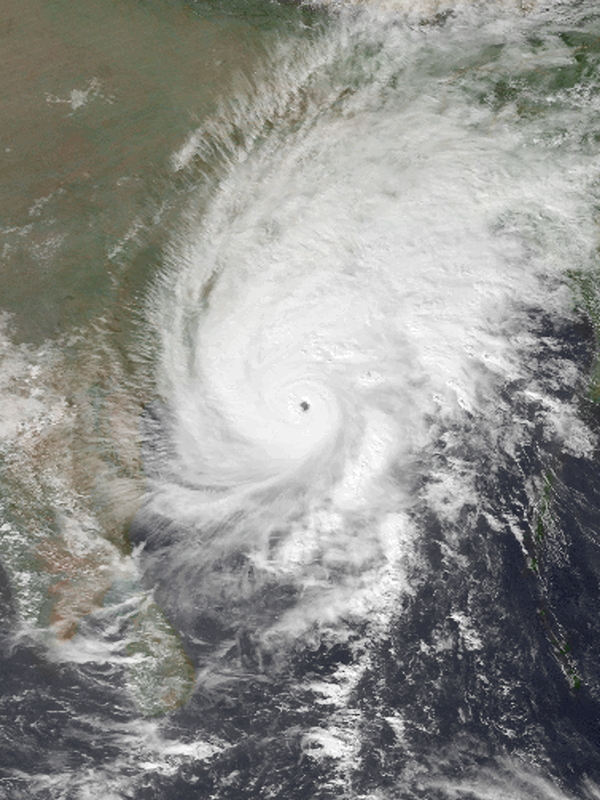
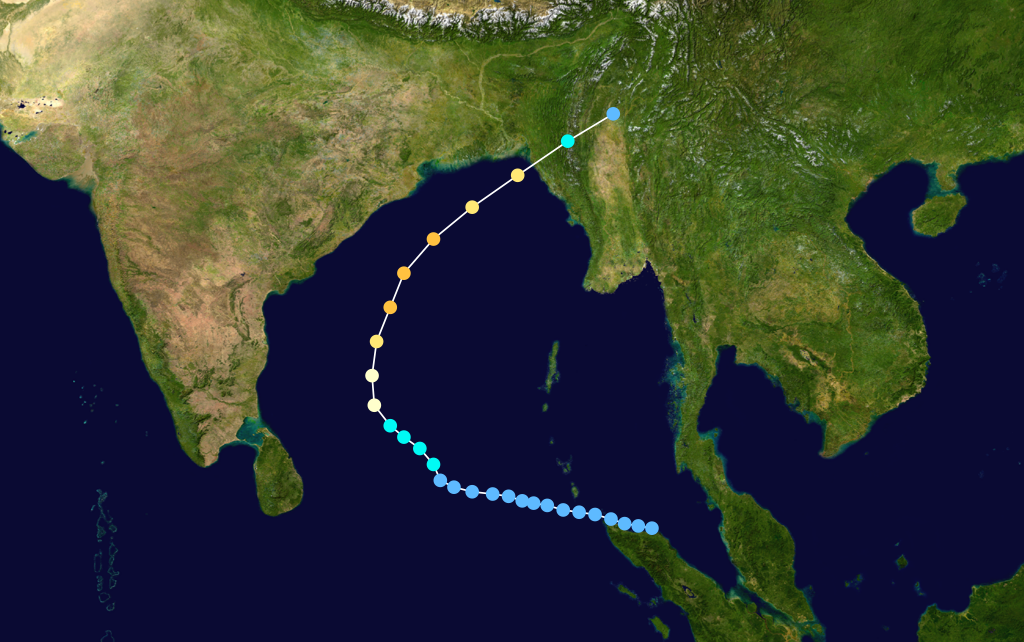
- Duration: November 21 – November 25
- Peak intensity: 190 km/h (115 mph) (3-min); 956 hPa (mbar)

An area of convection blossomed near northern Sumatra on November 18, associated with the monsoon. Aided by the same westerly wind burst that assisted Cyclone Daryl in the Southern Hemisphere, the disturbance gradually organized and persisted while moving west-northwestward through the Bay of Bengal. Late on November 21, the system developed into a depression, which the JTWC classified as Tropical Cyclone 04B. Steady intensification ensued; by November 23, the JTWC upgraded the cyclone to the equivalent of a minimal hurricane, and the IMD steadily upgraded the storm to increasing categories. The storm turned to the north and northeast around a ridge, accelerating toward land. At 06:00 UTC on November 24, the JTWC estimated peak 1 minute winds of 195 km/h (120 mph). Shortly thereafter, the IMD estimated peak 3 minute winds of 190 km/h (120 mph), making the system an extremely severe cyclonic storm. By that time, the system had a well-defined eye in the center of deep convection with an eye temperature of −8.7 °C, warmest in North Indian Ocean. Due to increasing wind shear, the storm weakened and made landfall over southeastern Bangladesh with winds of around 120 km/h (75 mph), south of Cox's Bazar around 09:00 UTC on November 25. A few hours later, the system degenerated into a remnant low over northern Myanmar.

Along the coast of Bangladesh, Cox's Bazar reported winds of 93 km/h (58 mph). The storm brought heavy rainfall and produced high waves that flooded offshore islands with a 0.91 to 1.22 m (3 to 4 ft) storm surge. Most residents of the offshore islands were evacuated ahead of the storm, totaling 300,000 evacuees. About 10,000 huts were destroyed, mostly made of mud and straw, while crops in the region were damaged. The storm's winds cut power lines and communication links in the hardest hit areas. Initially, about 500 fishermen were missing after the storm's passage; most were rescued or swam ashore, but over 100 people were killed when 10 boats were lost. The International Disaster Database listed 172 fatalities associated with the storm. In neighboring Myanmar, the cyclone destroyed most of the rice crop in Rakhine State just before the harvest, forcing many Rohingya farmers to borrow money to compensate for lost income.

== Season effects ==
This is a table of all storms in the 1995 North Indian Ocean cyclone season. It mentions all of the season's storms and their names, duration, peak intensities (according to the IMD storm scale), damage, and death totals. Damage and death totals include the damage and deaths caused when that storm was a precursor wave or extratropical low, and all of the damage figures are in 1995 USD.

Name	Dates	Peak intensity			Areas affected	Damage (USD)	Deaths	Ref(s).
Name	Dates	Category	Wind speed	Pressure "	Areas affected	Damage (USD)	Deaths	Ref(s).
BOB 01	May 6	Deep depression	Not specified	Not specified	South India	None	None	
BOB 02	May 8–10	Deep depression	Not specified	Not specified	Andhra Pradesh	None	39	
BOB 03	May 14–18	Deep depression	Not specified	Not specified	Odisha	None	107	
BOB 04	September 15–17	Depression	45 km/h (30 mph)	998 hPa (29.47 inHg)	Myanmar, Odisha, East India	None	None	
BOB 05	September 26–28	Depression	Not specified	Not specified	West Bengal, East India	None	None	
ARB 01	October 13–17	Cyclonic storm	85 km/h (55 mph)	996 hPa (29.41 inHg)	West India, Oman, Yemen, Somalia	None	None	
BOB 06	November 7–11	Very severe cyclonic storm	120 km/h (75 mph)	984 hPa (29.06 inHg)	India, Bangladesh, Nepal	$46.3 million	236	
BOB 07	November 21–25	Extremely severe cyclonic storm	190 km/h (120 mph)	956 hPa (28.23 inHg)	Sumatra, Myanmar, Bangladesh	Unknown	172	
Season aggregates
8 systems	May 6 – November 25		190 km/h (120 mph)	956 hPa (28.23 inHg)		$46.3 million	554	

== See also ==
- North Indian Ocean cyclone season
- 1995 Atlantic hurricane season
- 1995 Pacific hurricane season
- 1995 Pacific typhoon season
- South-West Indian Ocean cyclone season: 1994–95, 1995–96
- Australian region cyclone season: 1994–95, 1995–96
- South Pacific cyclone season: 1994–95, 1995–96
