= 1985 Pacific typhoon season =

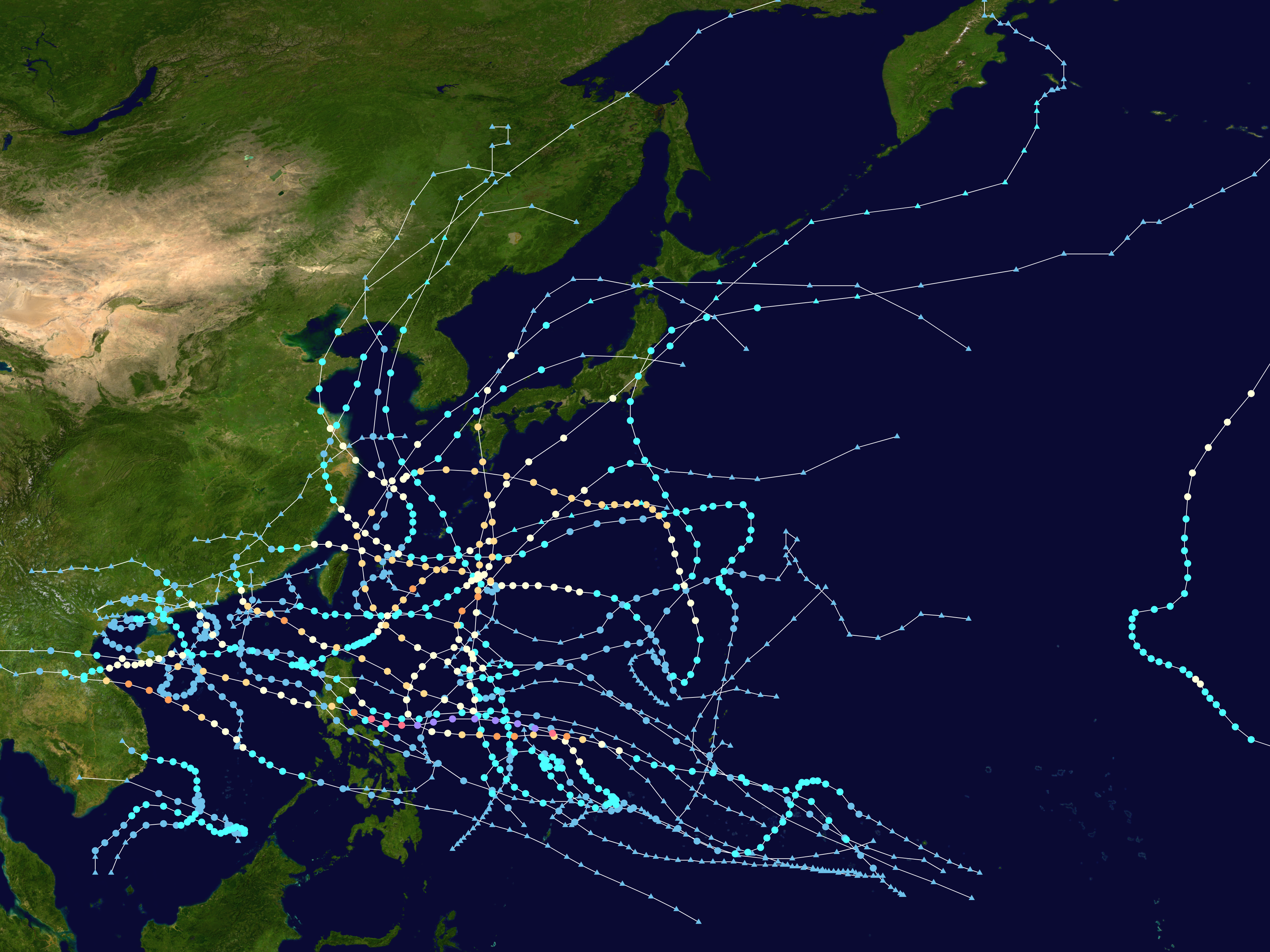
- Season summary map

Seasonal boundaries
- First system formed: January 4, 1985
- Last system dissipated: December 23, 1985

Strongest storm
- Name: Dot
  - Maximum winds: 220 km/h (140 mph) (10-minute sustained)
  - Lowest pressure: 895 hPa (mbar)

Seasonal statistics
- Total depressions: 57
- Total storms: 28, 2 unofficial
- Typhoons: 15
- Very strong typhoons: 3
- Violent typhoons: 1
- Total fatalities: 1,355
- Total damage: > $243.1 million (1985 USD)

Related articles
- 1985 Atlantic hurricane season; 1985 Pacific hurricane season; 1985 North Indian Ocean cyclone season

The 1985 Pacific typhoon season was a slightly above average season in terms of named storms, though most storms were weak and short-lived. The season had 28 named storms, 15 typhoons and 1 super typhoon. It ran year-round, thus ending the two-season run which began in 1983 that only had tropical cyclones forming between May and November. These dates conventionally delimit the period of each year when most tropical cyclones form in the northwestern Pacific Ocean. A total of 57 tropical depressions formed this year, of which only 28 became tropical storms and were assigned a name by the Joint Typhoon Warning Center. This made the season well above average. Additionally, tropical depressions that enter or form in the Philippine area of responsibility were assigned a name by the Philippine Atmospheric, Geophysical and Astronomical Services Administration or PAGASA. This can often result in the same storm having two names. This year, a total of 17 storms were named this way.

The strongest cyclone of the season, Dot, reached category 5 on the Saffir–Simpson scale to the east of the Philippines. Typhoon Cecil was the deadliest storm of the season, accounting for nearly half of the deaths from western Pacific tropical cyclones in 1985. The season featured Odessa, Pat, and Ruby, a rare example of a tertiary Fujiwhara interaction.

== Season summary ==
A total of 29 tropical depressions formed this year in the Western Pacific, of which 28 became tropical storms. 17 storms reached typhoon intensity, of which 1 reached super typhoon strength. Only four tropical cyclones moved through the Philippines this season, while eight moved into China, three moved into Vietnam, and three moved into Japan. Tropical cyclones brought Hong Kong 40 percent of its annual rainfall. The strongest cyclone of the season, Dot, reached category 5 on the Saffir–Simpson scale. However, it weakened slightly before moving into the Philippines at the high end of category 3 status. Typhoon Cecil was the deadliest storm of the season, accounting for nearly half of the deaths from western Pacific tropical cyclones in 1985.

== Systems ==
=== Severe Tropical Storm Fabian (Atring) ===
- Severe tropical storm (JMA)
- Tropical storm (SSHWS)
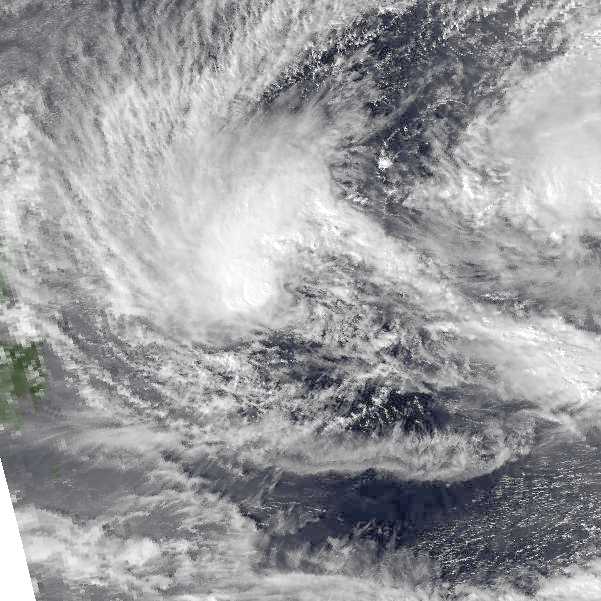
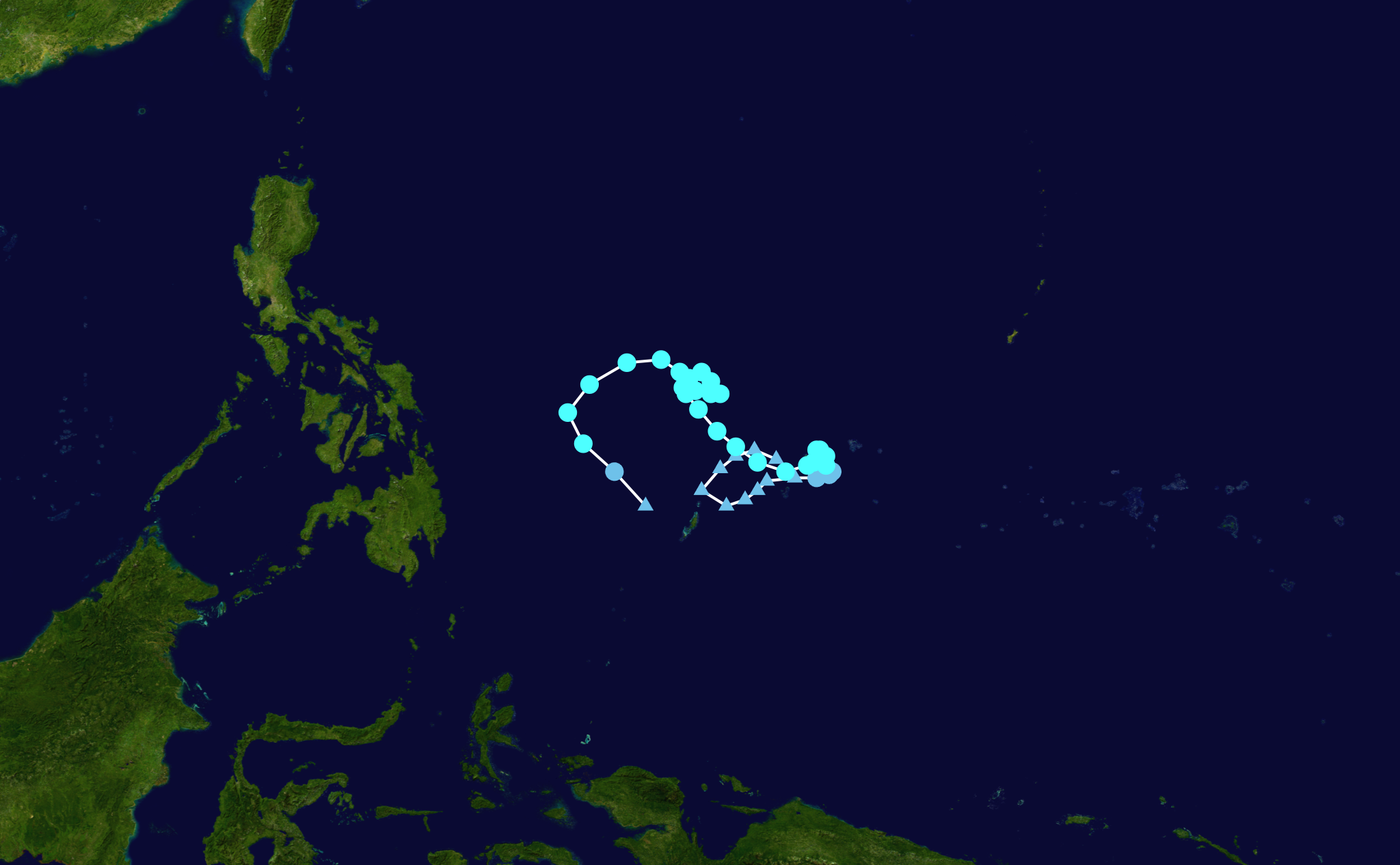
- Duration: January 4 – January 13
- Peak intensity: 95 km/h (60 mph) (10-min); 990 hPa (mbar)

The initial tropical disturbance formed on the west end of the near-equatorial, or monsoon, trough. Due to strong high pressure due its north, and the associated high winds associated with the northern Asian monsoon, strongest winds within the system were on its western periphery. Strong southerly winds aloft led to persistent vertical wind shear, which limited its intensification is it moved west to northwest. It passed nearby Yap, and caused crop damage as it passed by the island group.

=== Tropical Storm Elsie ===
- Tropical storm (JMA)
- Tropical storm (SSHWS)
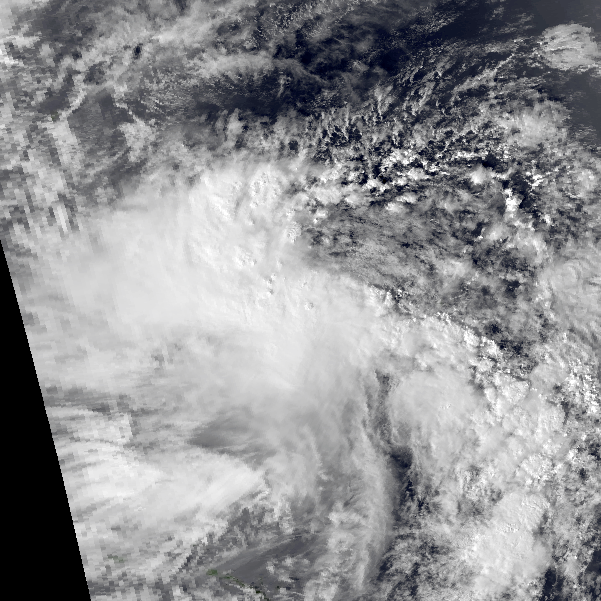
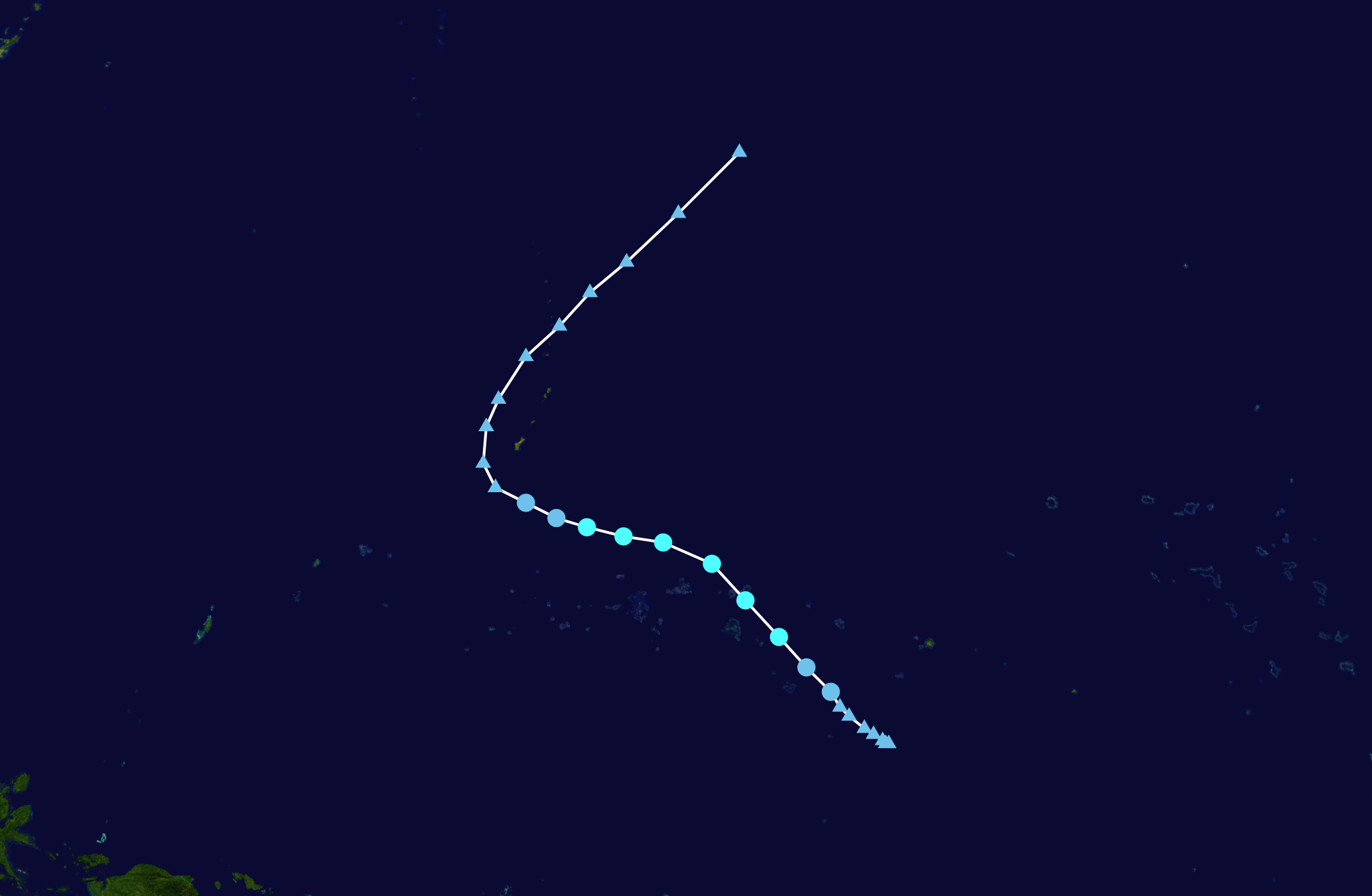
- Duration: January 7 – January 11
- Peak intensity: 65 km/h (40 mph) (10-min); 1000 hPa (mbar)

This was the first tropical cyclone to form in the northwest Pacific basin in January in six years. Forming along the near equatorial trough, two circulations formed on either side of Guam. Elsie formed from the eastern circulation, appearing southwest of Pohnpei on January 4. On January 5, further convective development occurred which formed a low level circulation on January 6. Becoming a tropical depression late that day and a tropical storm on January 7, the system moved northwest, reaching its peak intensity late in the day. Thereafter, strong southerly winds aloft arrested development, and weakening began. Tropical depression status was regained on January 8, and its circulation dissipated early January 9.

=== CMA Tropical Storm Three ===
- Tropical storm (CMA)
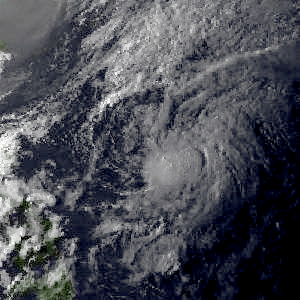
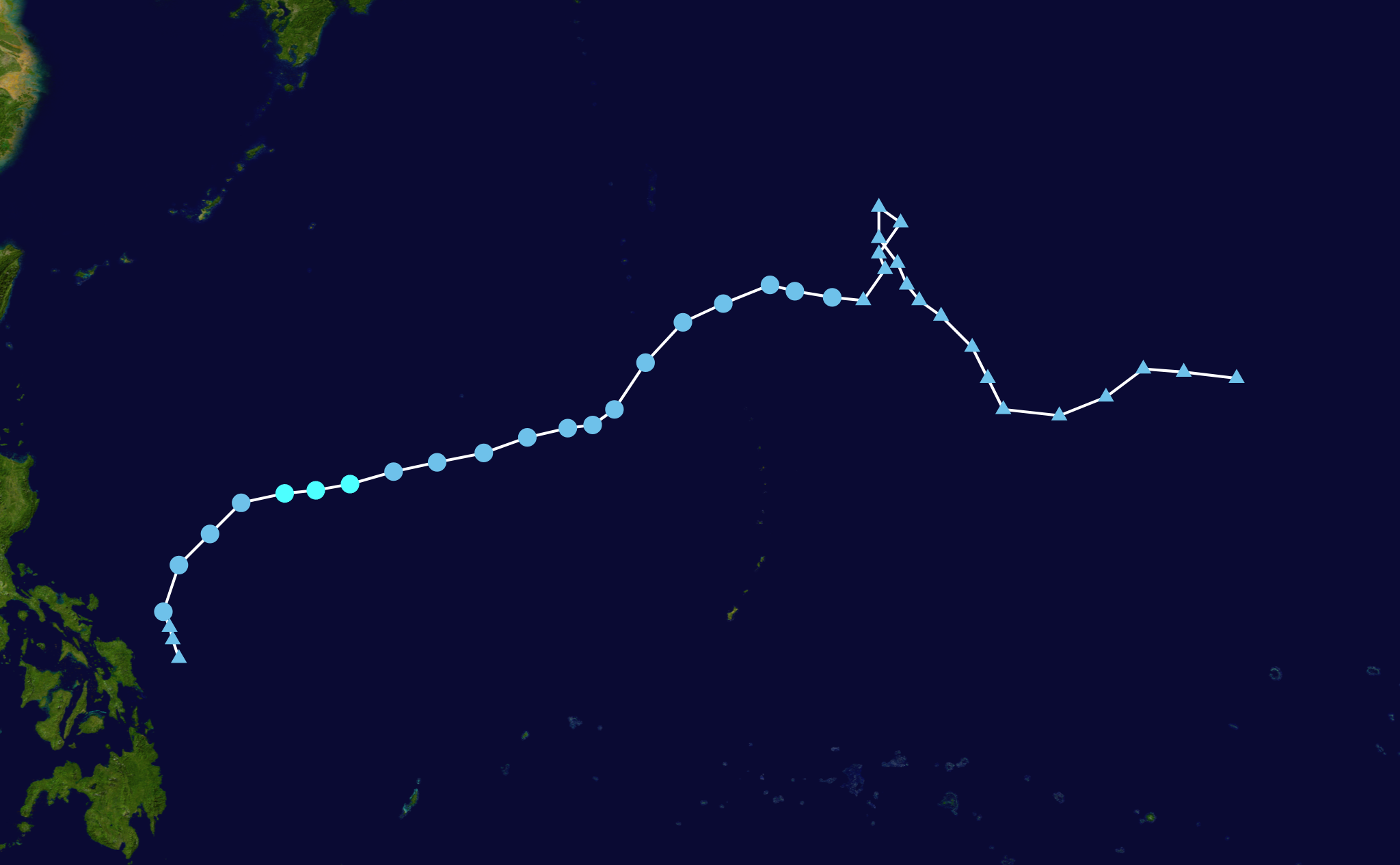
- Duration: April 21 – April 26
- Peak intensity: 75 km/h (45 mph) (10-min); 1000 hPa (mbar)

A tropical depression formed 740 kilometres (460 mi) east of Luzon on April 22. Moving east-northeast for a couple days, the system dissipated on April 24 770 kilometres (480 mi) north-northwest of Guam.

=== Typhoon Gay (Bining) ===
- Typhoon (JMA)
- Category 3 typhoon (SSHWS)
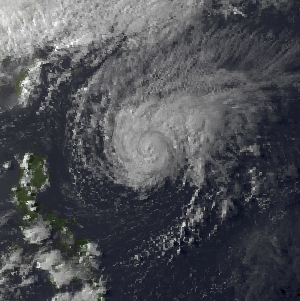
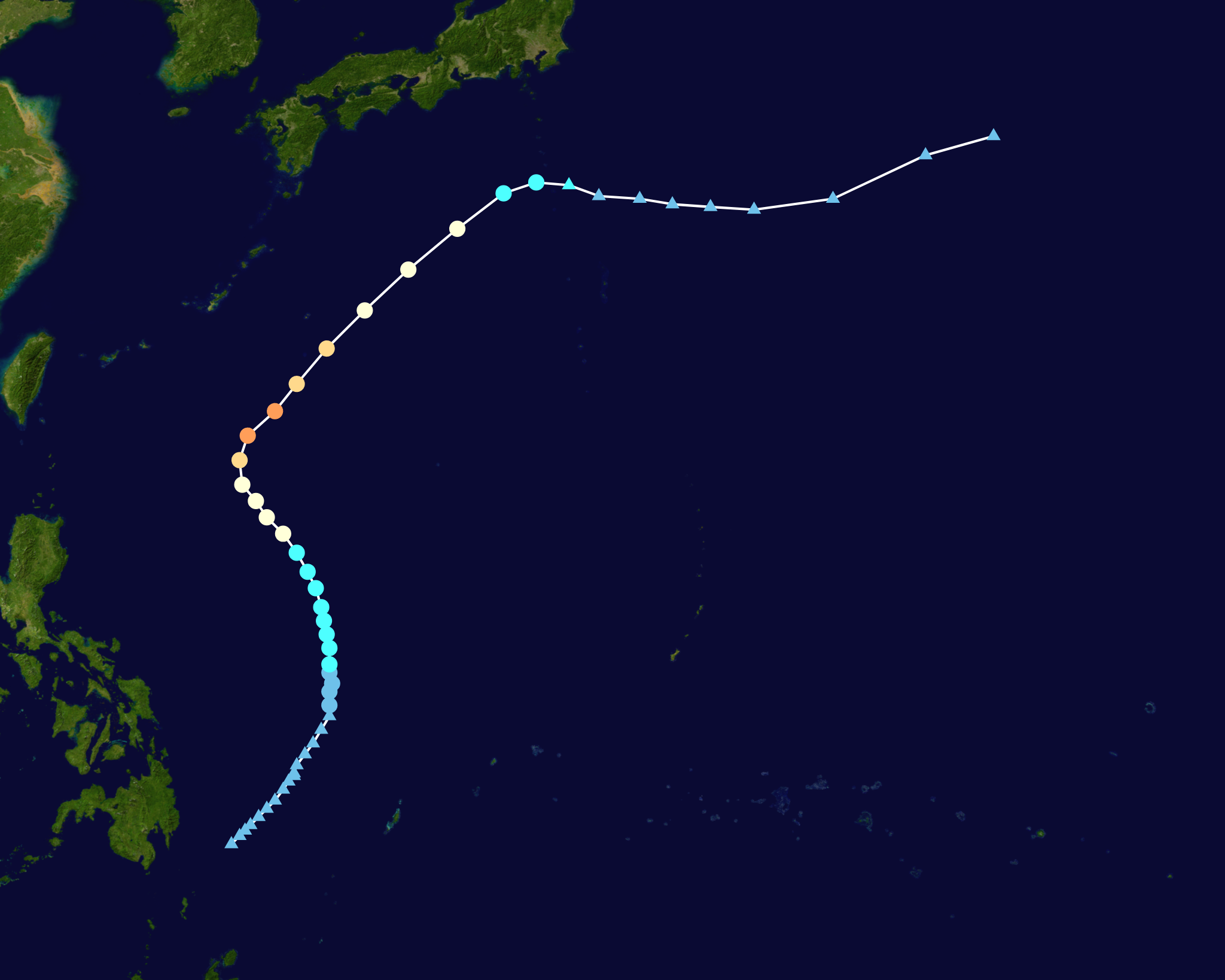
- Duration: May 20 – May 26
- Peak intensity: 150 km/h (90 mph) (10-min); 950 hPa (mbar)

Gay was the third tropical cyclone and first typhoon of the 1985 Pacific typhoon season. After over four months of inactivity, on May 16, a strong atmospheric circulation formed 380 nmi (700 km) west of Koror, now part of Palau. The circulation began to develop convection and by May 20 had organized into a depression. Heading north, the storm took two days to gain tropical storm strength, likely because a tropical upper tropospheric trough (TUTT) was so close to the north, restricting outflow. However, the trough soon weakened and outflow improved and the storm began to intensify faster. Gay became a typhoon early on May 23, continuing to intensify, Gay came under influence of a frontal boundary to the northwest and began to recurve to the northeast, through a weakness in the subtropical ridge created by the trough associated with the frontal boundary. This trough began to build and dig southeastward, pouring fuel into Gay's engine. Typhoon Gay reached its peak intensity of 100 knots (120 mph; 190 km/h) on May 24. As cool, dry air became entrained within Gay's circulation, the cyclone began to weaken. Gay underwent extratropical transition as it interacted with the frontal boundary. Gay became extratropical shortly after weakening to a tropical storm early on May 26.

=== Tropical Storm 04W ===
- Tropical storm (JMA)
- Tropical depression (SSHWS)
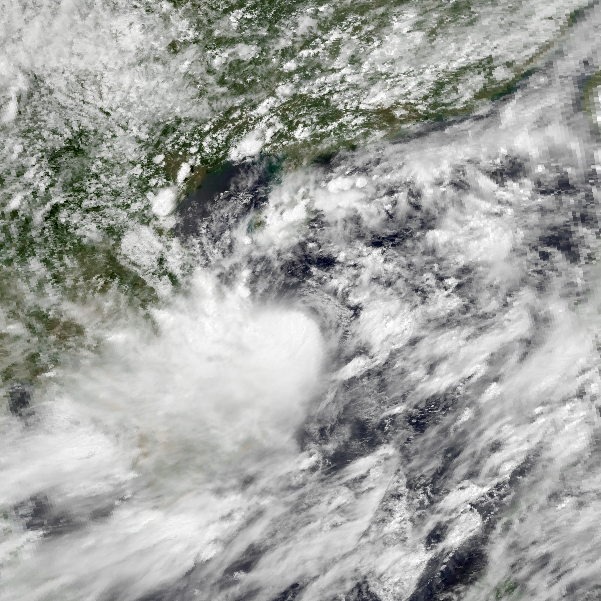
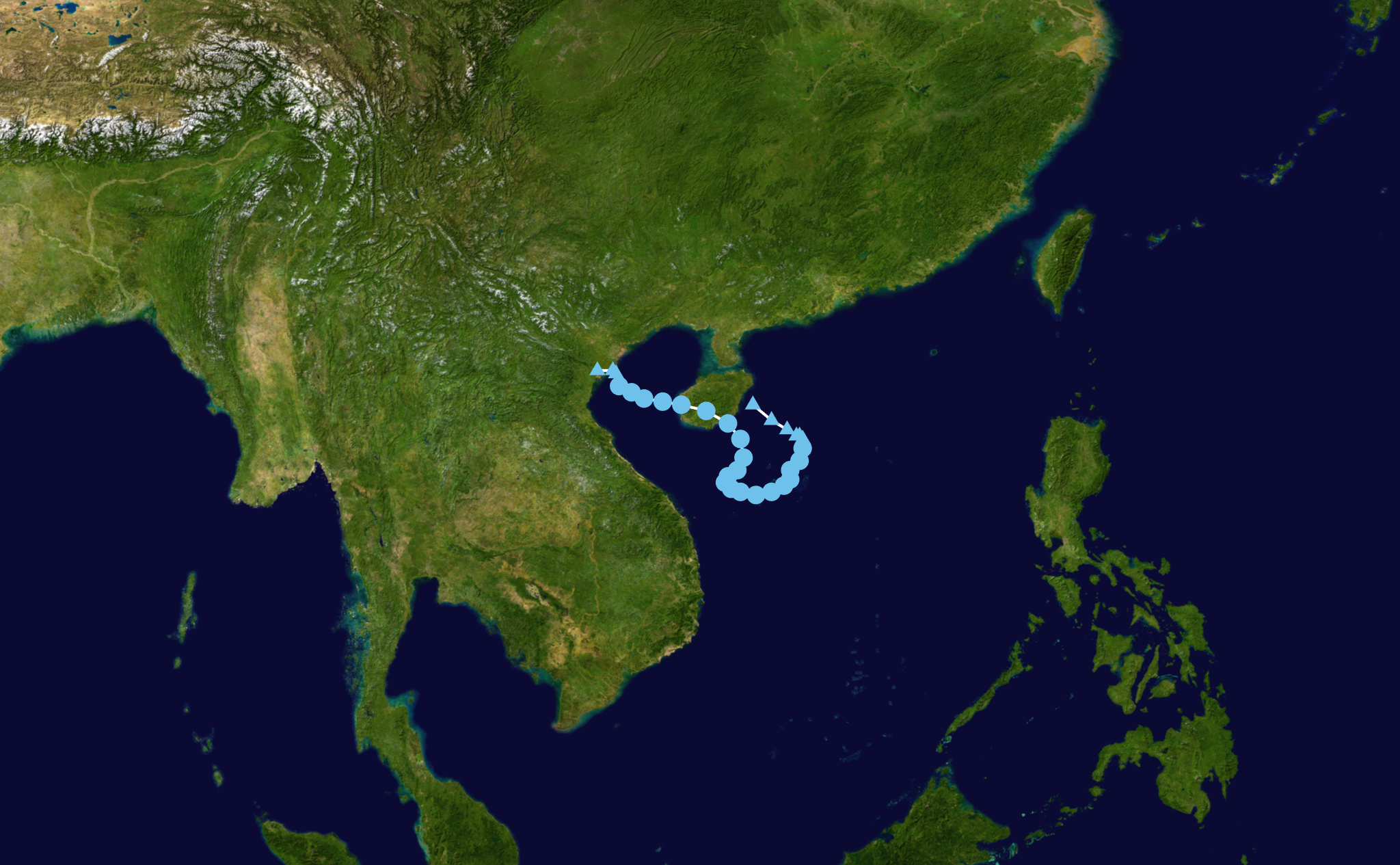
- Duration: June 14 – June 22
- Peak intensity: 65 km/h (40 mph) (10-min); 990 hPa (mbar)

This system formed within the northern portion of the monsoon trough on June 16. Strong northeast winds aloft kept its circulation center on the northeast side of its stronger thunderstorm activity. The system drifted generally northwest, making landfall on Hainan Island before dissipating. While never upgraded by the Joint Typhoon Warning Center, the Japanese Meteorological Agency considered the system a weak tropical storm,

=== Typhoon Hal (Kuring) ===
- Typhoon (JMA)
- Category 3 typhoon (SSHWS)
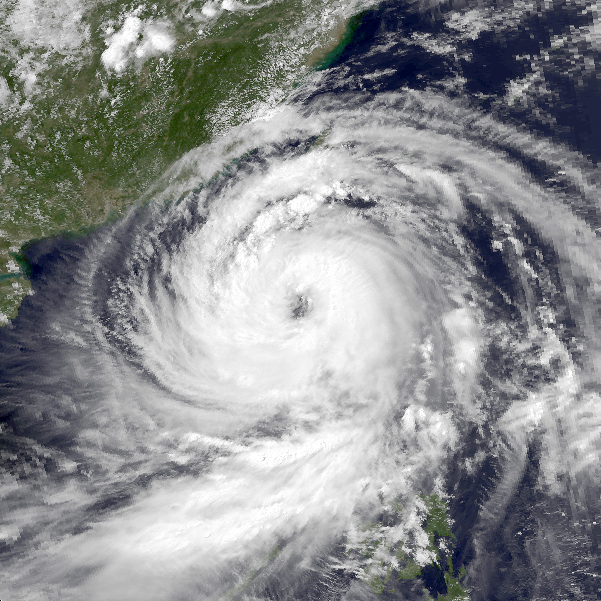
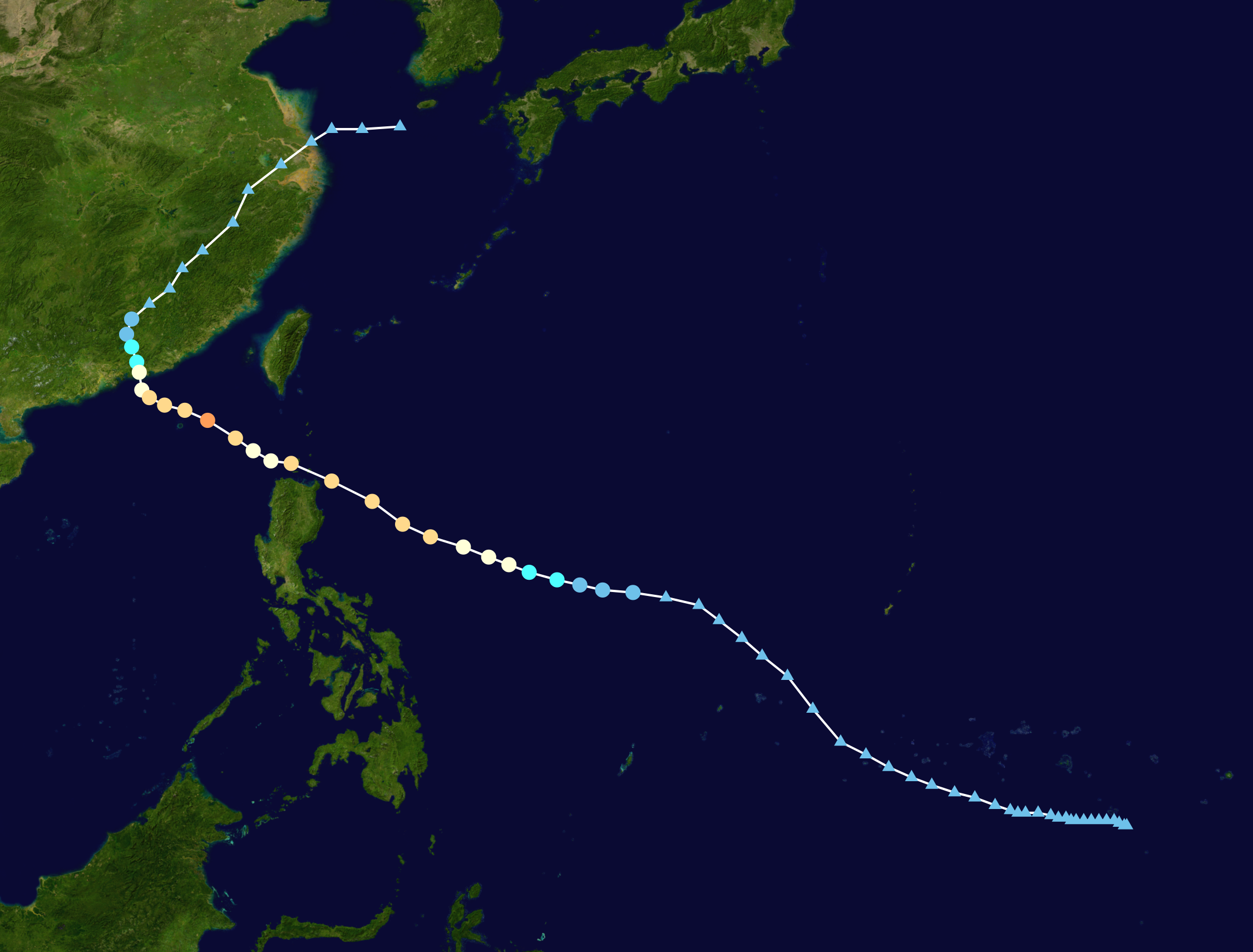
- Duration: June 19 – June 27
- Peak intensity: 150 km/h (90 mph) (10-min); 960 hPa (mbar)

Typhoon Hal, which formed on June 19 east of the Philippines, passed just north of Luzon on the 22nd as a 95 mph (153 km/h) typhoon. After briefly weakening Hal restrengthened to a peak of 115 mph (185 km/h) before weakening back to a minimal typhoon. Sustained winds reached 48 knots (89 km/h) at Lan Yu, Taiwan. The 75 mph (121 km/h) typhoon hit 75 nautical miles (139 km) east-southeast of Hong Kong in southeastern China on the 24th, and dissipated the next day. In Hong Kong, winds peaked at 74 knots (137 km/h) at Kwai Chung, and a total of 285.5 millimetres (11.24 in) fell at Tate's Cairn which led to landslides across the region. Heavy rain associated with the typhoon caused 38 deaths (with 14 missing) and widespread crop and structural damage. Damage totalled US$12.3 million (1985 dollars).

=== Typhoon Irma (Daling) ===
- Typhoon (JMA)
- Category 2 typhoon (SSHWS)
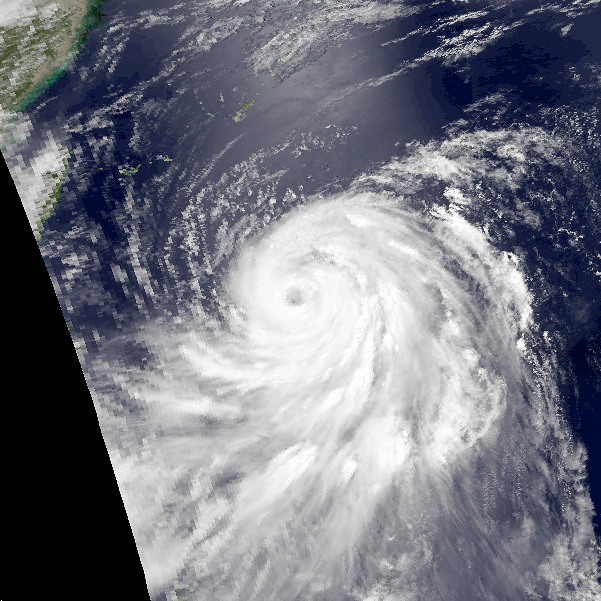
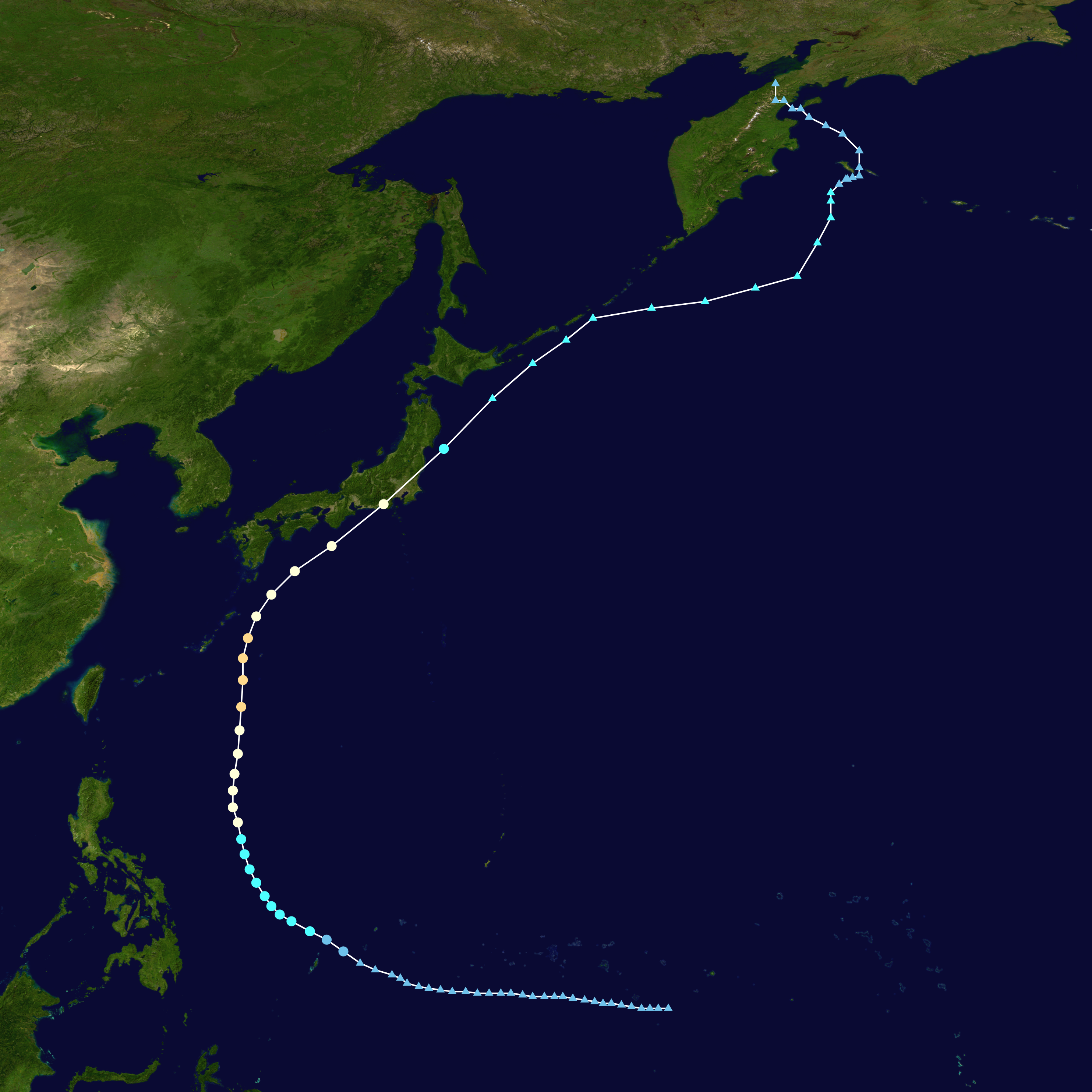
- Duration: June 24 – July 1
- Peak intensity: 150 km/h (90 mph) (10-min); 955 hPa (mbar)

First noted southwest of Ponape on June 17, the tropical disturbance moved westward for the next several days without significant development. As it turned northwest on June 25, the system strengthened rapidly into a tropical storm, reaching typhoon intensity on June 27 as it turned more poleward. The system recurved just offshore the southern islands of Japan before striking southwest of Tokyo, Japan as a typhoon on July 1. Weakening as it accelerated northeast, Irma regained tropical storm intensity later that day and became an extratropical cyclone that night. As Irma passed to the east of the Philippines the system enhanced the Monsoon Trough causing heavy rains over Luzon Island. A total of 46 people were killed and 1,500 homes were destroyed. In Japan Irma killed 3 people and left 5 missing. Over 20,000 houses were damaged and 50,000 hectares of farmland were ruined. Damage across the Philippines and Japan totalled US$80 million (1985 dollars).

=== Tropical Depression Elang ===
- Tropical depression (JMA)
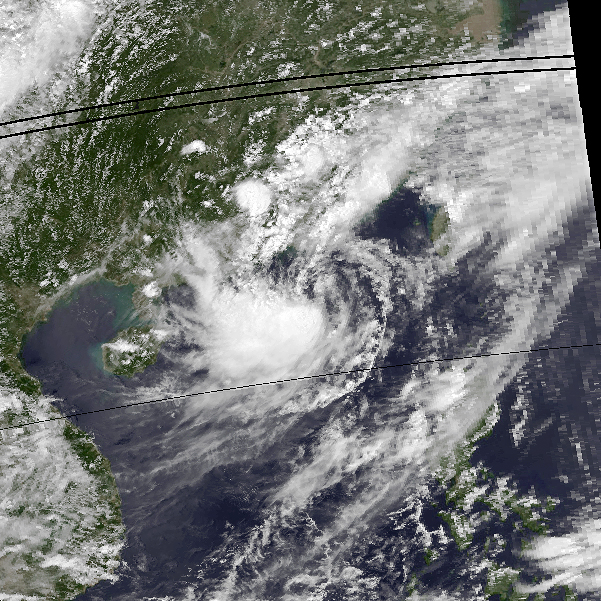
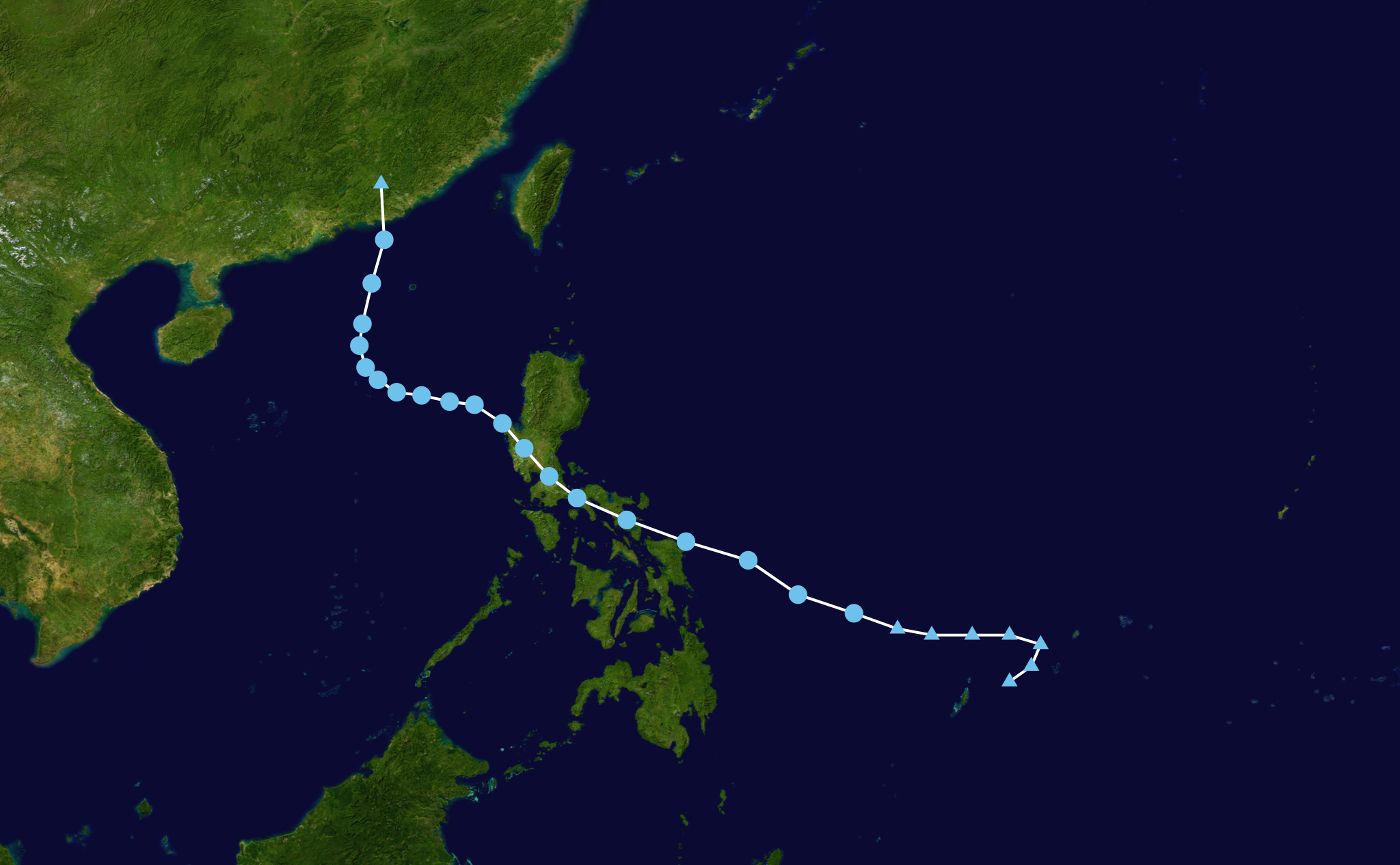
- Duration: July 4 – July 8
- Peak intensity: 55 km/h (35 mph) (10-min); 998 hPa (mbar)

A tropical depression formed 1,050 kilometres (650 mi) east-southeast of Manila on July 4. Moving west-northwest, the system crossed the central Philippines on July 5, moving into the South China Sea on July 6. Moving more towards the north on July 7, the depression moved inland into southern China east of Hong Kong on July 8. In Hong Kong, winds gusted to 47 knots (87 km/h) at Tate's Cairn, where 114.1 millimetres (4.49 in) fell. While Hong Kong considered it a tropical depression throughout its life cycle, PAGASA named the system and considered it a tropical storm.

=== Typhoon Jeff (Goring) ===
- Typhoon (JMA)
- Category 1 typhoon (SSHWS)
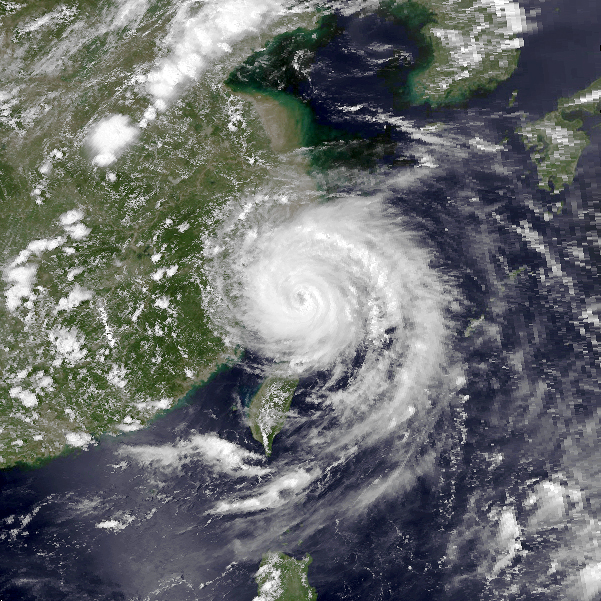
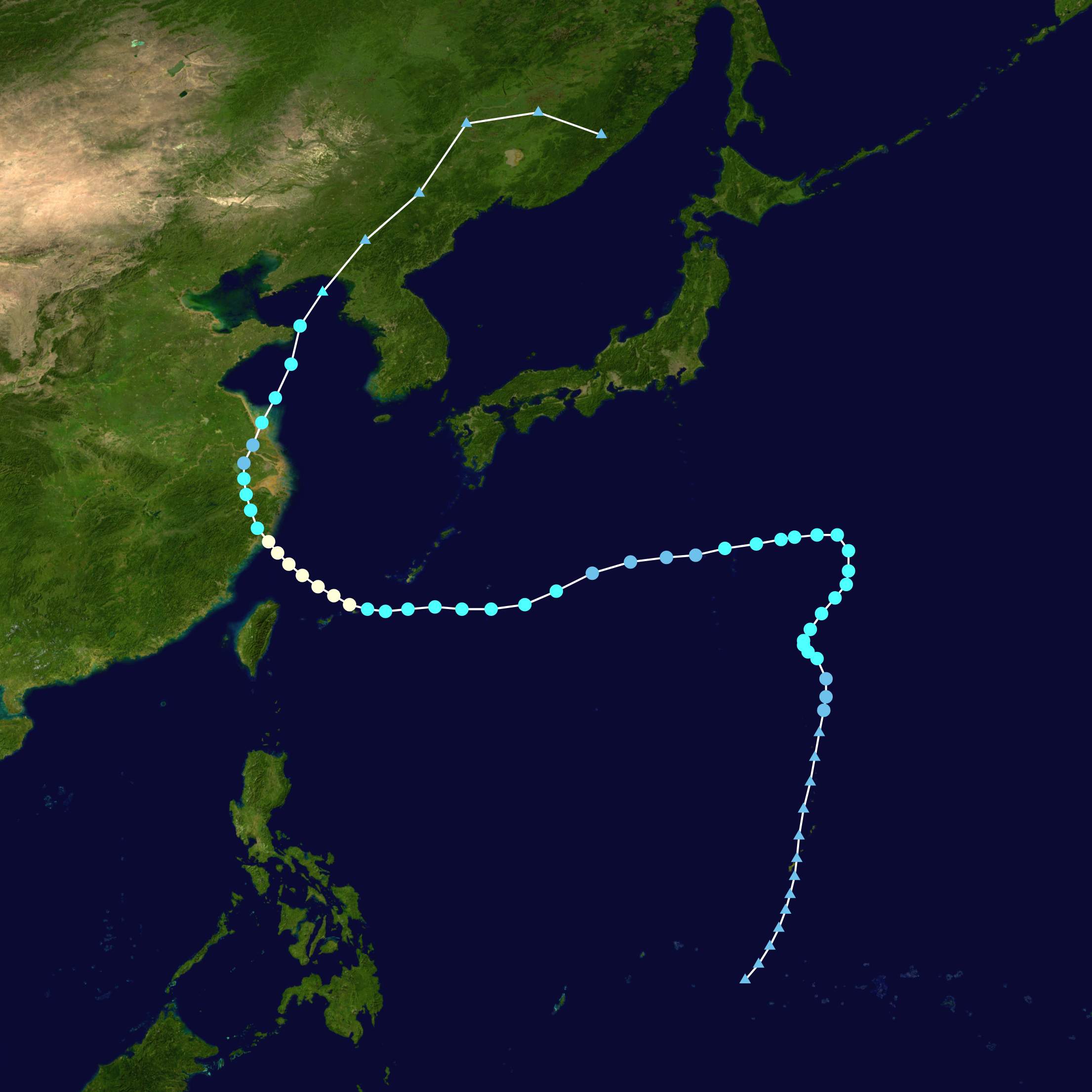
- Duration: July 21 – August 2
- Peak intensity: 130 km/h (80 mph) (10-min); 965 hPa (mbar)

The monsoon trough spawned a tropical depression in northwest of Guam on July 21. It tracked northward, becoming a tropical storm on the 22nd and reaching its first peak of 70 mph (110 km/h) winds on the 23rd. An upper-level trough outran the system, forcing Jeff westward into a shearing environment and weakening it to a depression on the 26th. The shear abated, and Jeff was able to restrengthen, becoming a storm on the 27th and a typhoon on the 29th. The 85 mph (137 km/h) typhoon hit eastern China on the 30th. It brought the heaviest rain to Shanghai since 1962. Jeff weakened rapidly to a depression, but upon reaching the Yellow Sea, it again restrengthened to a tropical storm on the 1st. Jeff reached a third peak of 60 mph (97 km/h) winds before becoming extratropical on the 2nd. A total of 245 people were killed from this storm, with moderate to heavy damage to crops.

=== Typhoon Kit ===
- Typhoon (JMA)
- Category 2 typhoon (SSHWS)
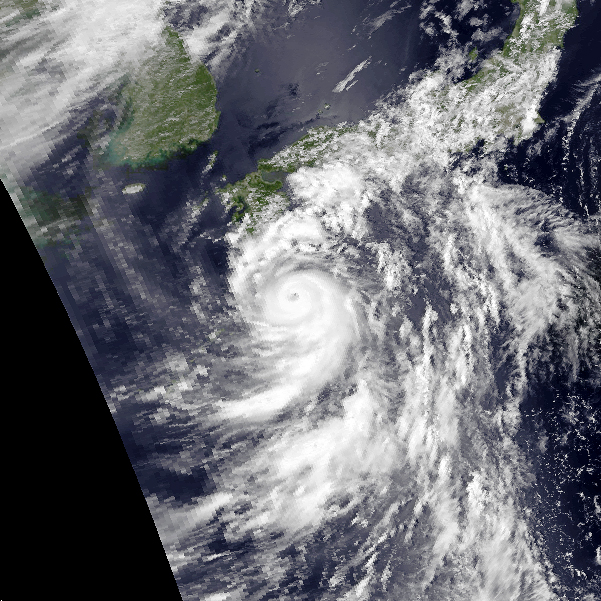
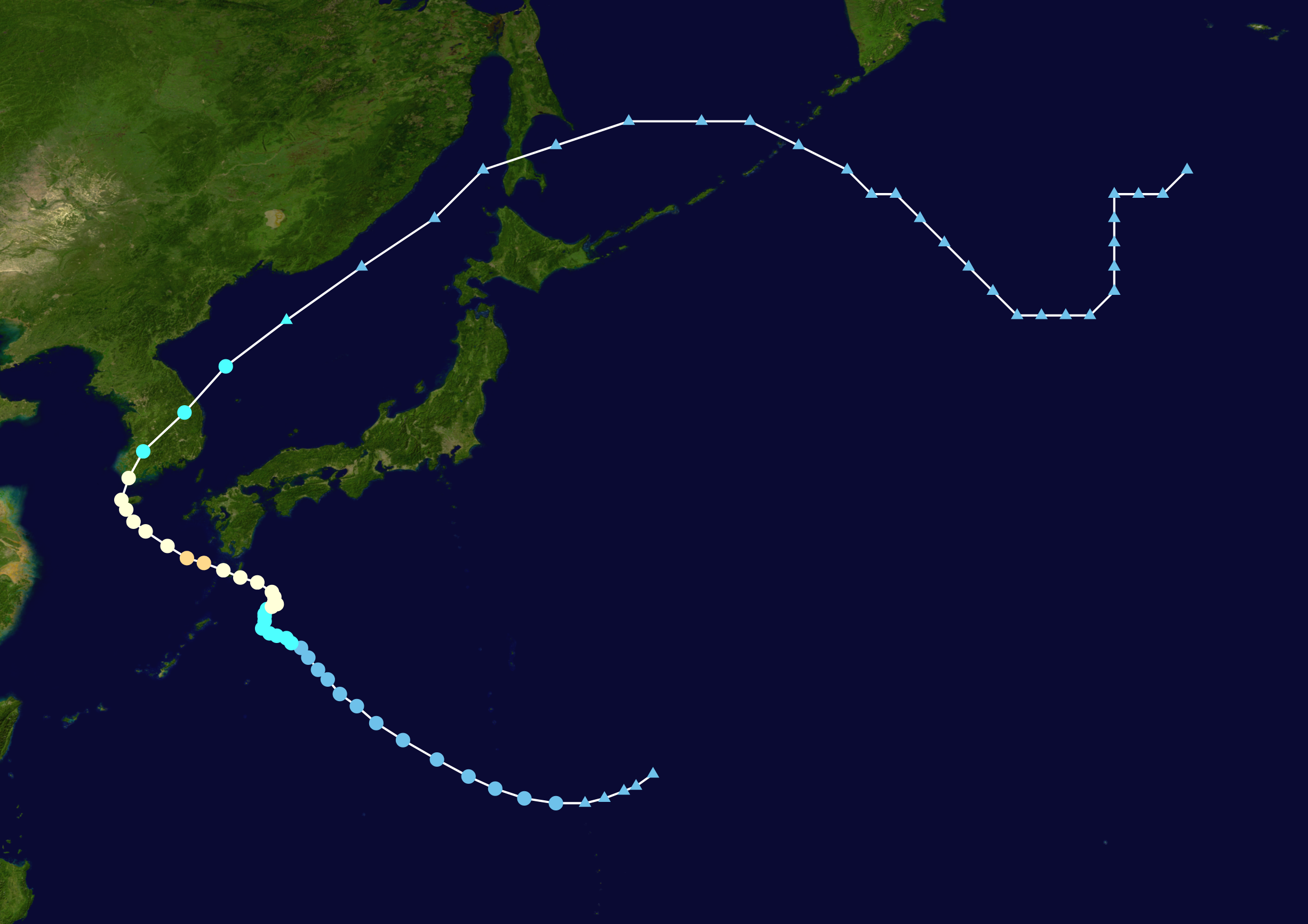
- Duration: July 31 – August 10
- Peak intensity: 130 km/h (80 mph) (10-min); 960 hPa (mbar)

Typhoon Kit was the first of seven tropical cyclones to form in the West Pacific in August. It formed from a disturbance at the north end of a monsoon trough. The disturbance quickly gained organization and formed into a tropical depression on August 2. The storm moved steadily to the northwest and steadily intensified. The depression became Tropical Storm Kit on August 4. The storm became a typhoon as it made a temporary jog to the north before continuing its northwest motion. The typhoon, small in size, reached its peak intensity of 85 knots (98 mph; 157 km/h) while south of Kyūshū on August 8. Kit recurved in the East China Sea in the face of an approaching trough which caused a weakness in the subtropical ridge. Kit made landfall on the south-western tip of South Korea as a weak typhoon. The storm killed twelve people from resultant flooding and caused significant property damage on Cheju Island and the southern coast of South Korea. Kit became an extratropical cyclone in the Sea of Japan. A total of US$3.7 million (1985 dollars) of damage were caused by Kit across South Korea and Japan.

=== Severe Tropical Storm Lee (Huling) ===
- Severe tropical storm (JMA)
- Tropical storm (SSHWS)
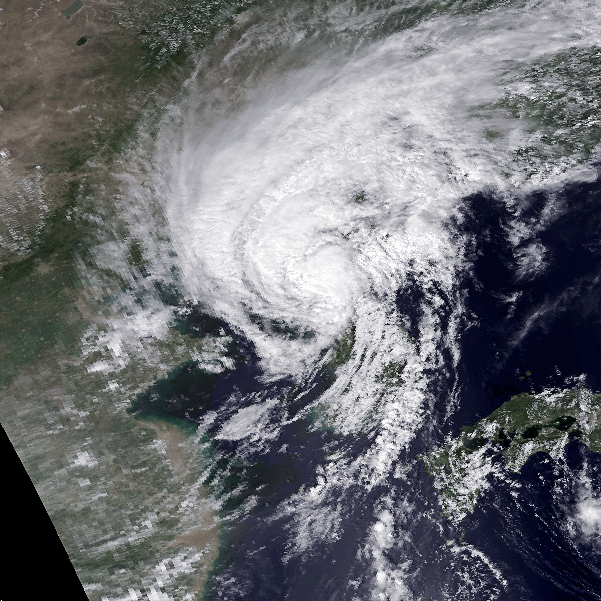
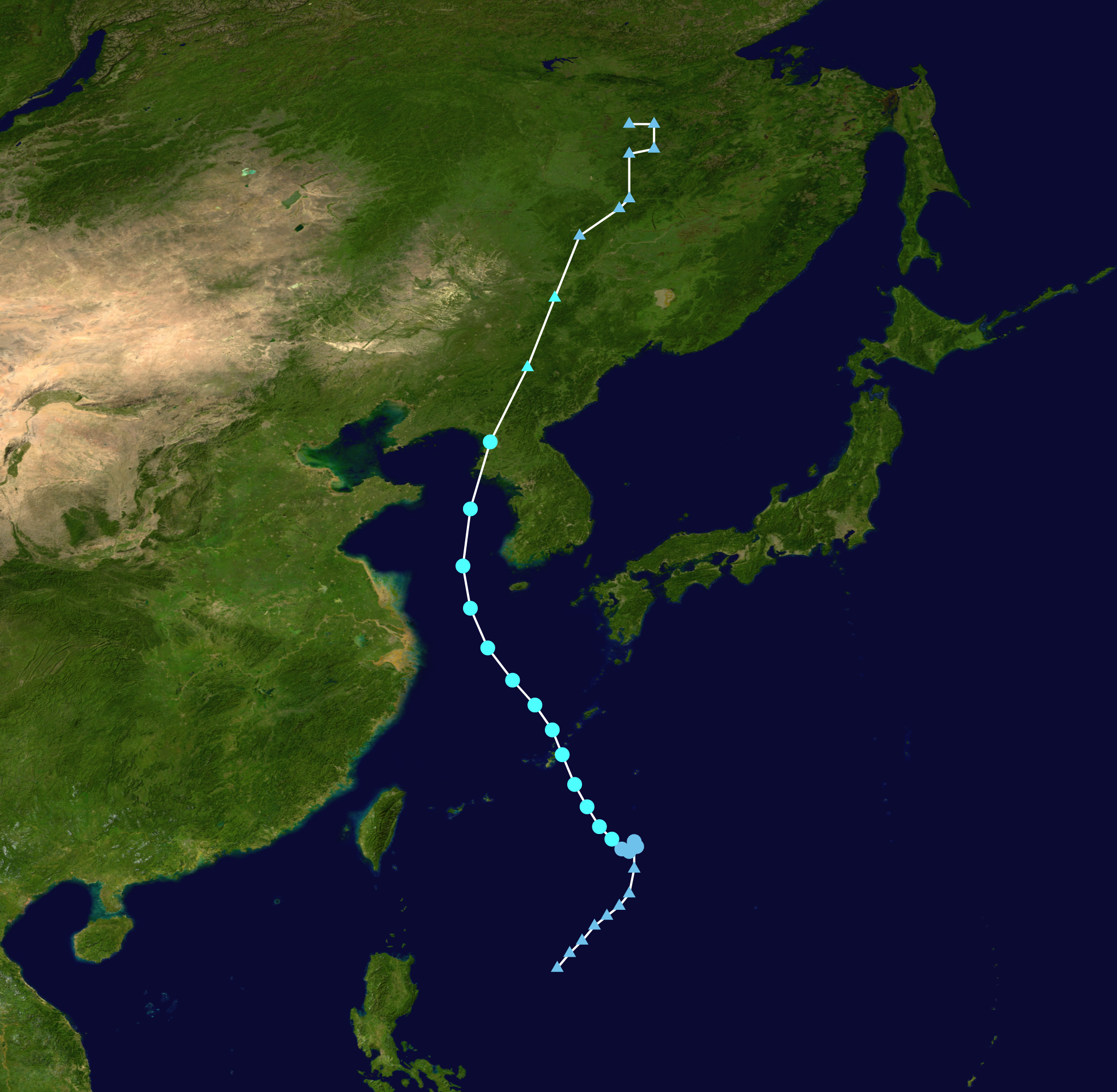
- Duration: August 9 – August 14
- Peak intensity: 110 km/h (70 mph) (10-min); 975 hPa (mbar)

Lee formed within the monsoon trough, and was initially influenced by Kit to its north. Kit's movement to the north reoriented the trough into a more north–south orientation, and a broad circulation formed 890 km south of Okinawa. Moving north-northeast, convection around the system began to organize into a more consolidated tropical storm. The system turned northwest, but development was halted by northerly vertical wind shear. Its circulation center remained fairly broad while it continued to deepen, more like a monsoon depression than a tropical cyclone. As the system passed close to Okinawa, winds remained fairly light. However, winds increased as it pulled away, due to the pressure gradient/strongest winds being well removed from the center. Continuing to move north into a break in the subtropical ridge, Lee moved through the East China Sea to about 445 km west of Kyūshū and stayed about 220 km offshore the western Korean Peninsula. By this time, the system was evolving into a more typical tropical cyclone, with stronger winds closer to the center. Accelerating across the Yellow Sea on August 14, Lee began to recurve across North Korea and subsequently weakened rapidly across the mountainous terrain. A total of US$3.9 million (1985 dollars) in damage was caused by Lee.

=== Typhoon Mamie ===
- Typhoon (JMA)
- Category 1 typhoon (SSHWS)
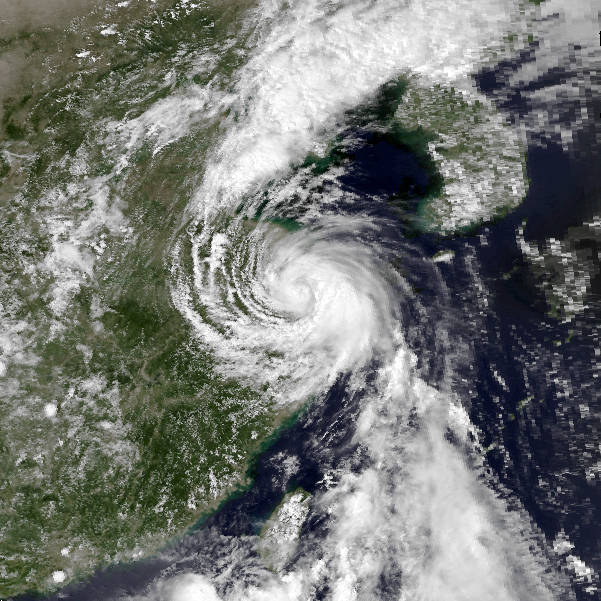
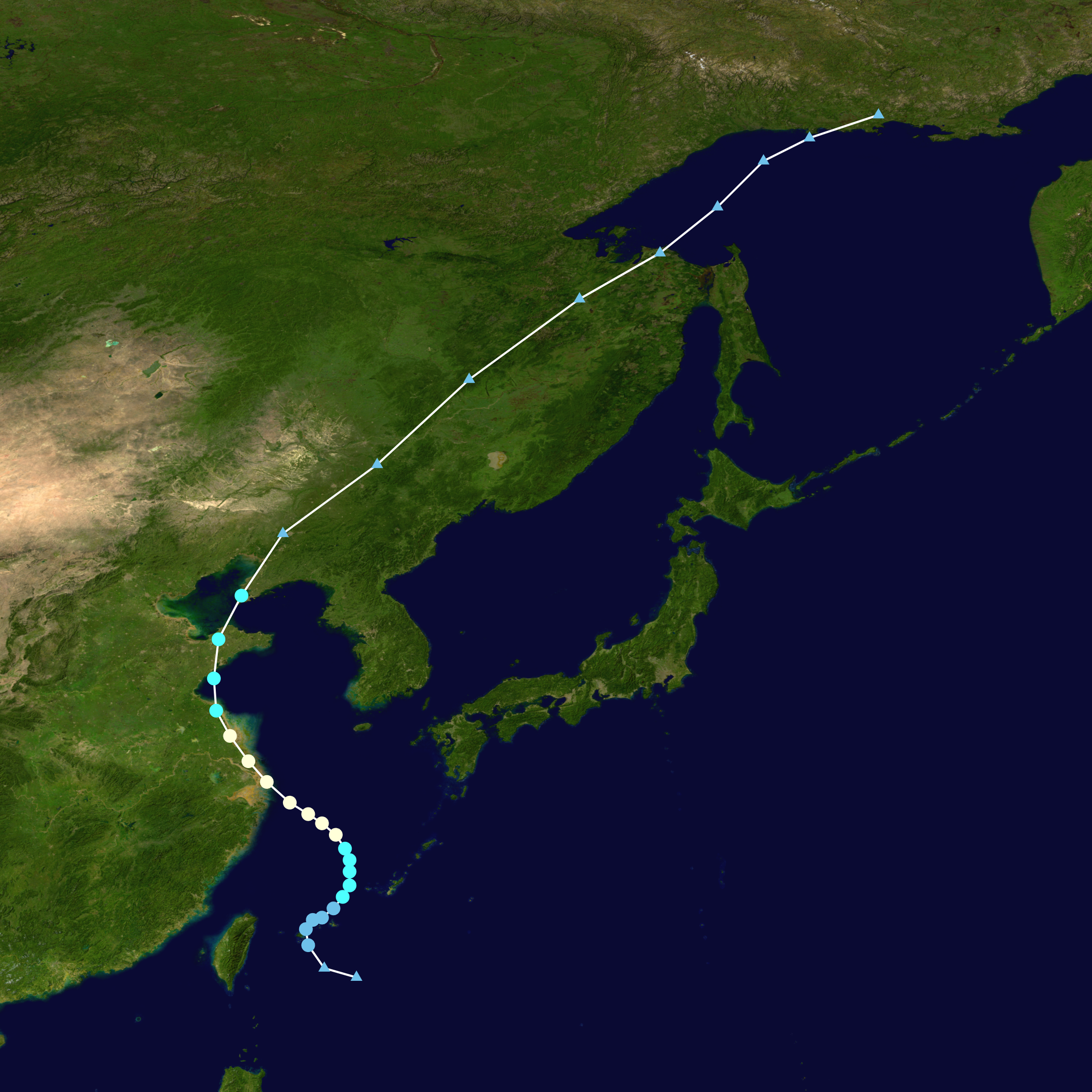
- Duration: August 14 – August 19
- Peak intensity: 120 km/h (75 mph) (10-min); 975 hPa (mbar)

On August 15, a tropical depression formed from the monsoon trough a short distance of northern Taiwan. It headed northeastward, becoming a tropical storm later that day. The building of the subtropical ridge to its east forced Mamie northwestward, where it became a typhoon on August 17. On August 18, the typhoon hit near Shanghai, China, and paralleled the east coast of China. The storm turned to the northeast, hit near Dairen, China, and dissipated on August 20. Mamie was responsible for 44 fatalities and heavy crop damage. Total damage amounted to US$13.7 million (1985 dollars).

=== Typhoon Nelson (Ibiang) ===
- Typhoon (JMA)
- Category 2 typhoon (SSHWS)
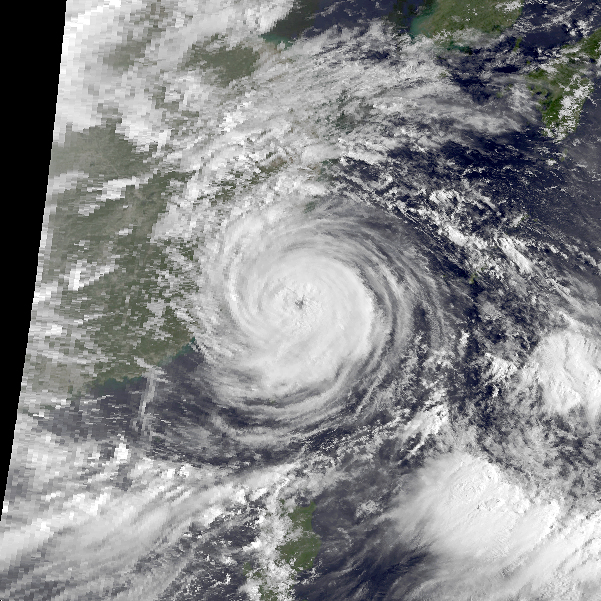
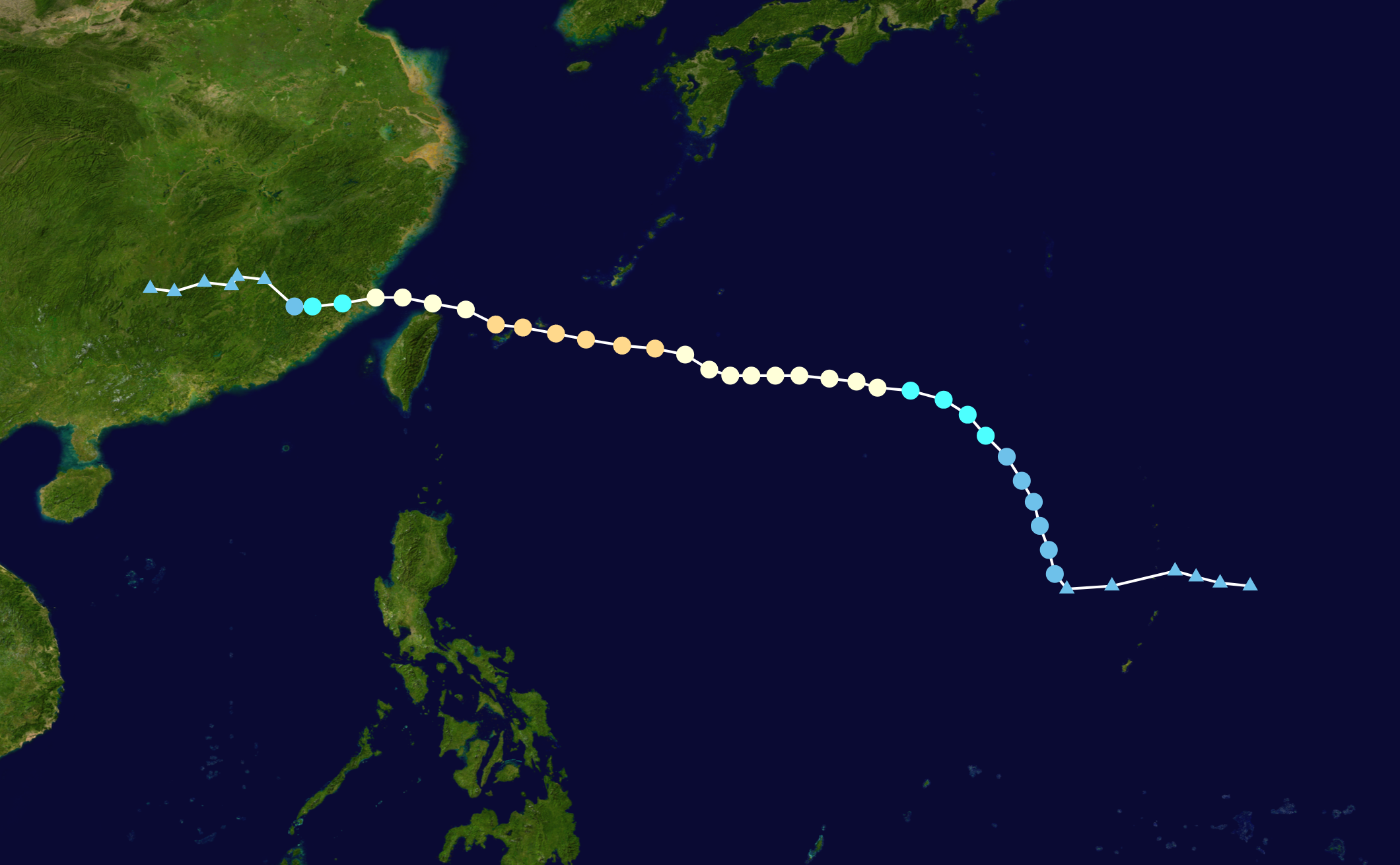
- Duration: August 16 – August 25
- Peak intensity: 150 km/h (90 mph) (10-min); 960 hPa (mbar)

Typhoon Nelson, which developed on August 16, moved northwest until reaching typhoon intensity, when a blocking ridge turned the system more to the west. The cyclone brushed northern Taiwan on August 23 as a 90 mph (140 km/h) typhoon. Later that day, it made landfall on eastern China before dissipating on August 24. Nelson caused 55 deaths and heavy damage across eastern China. In addition, the remnants of the storm stalled over the area, killing an additional 147 people.

=== CMA Severe Tropical Storm Eighteen ===
- Severe tropical storm (CMA)
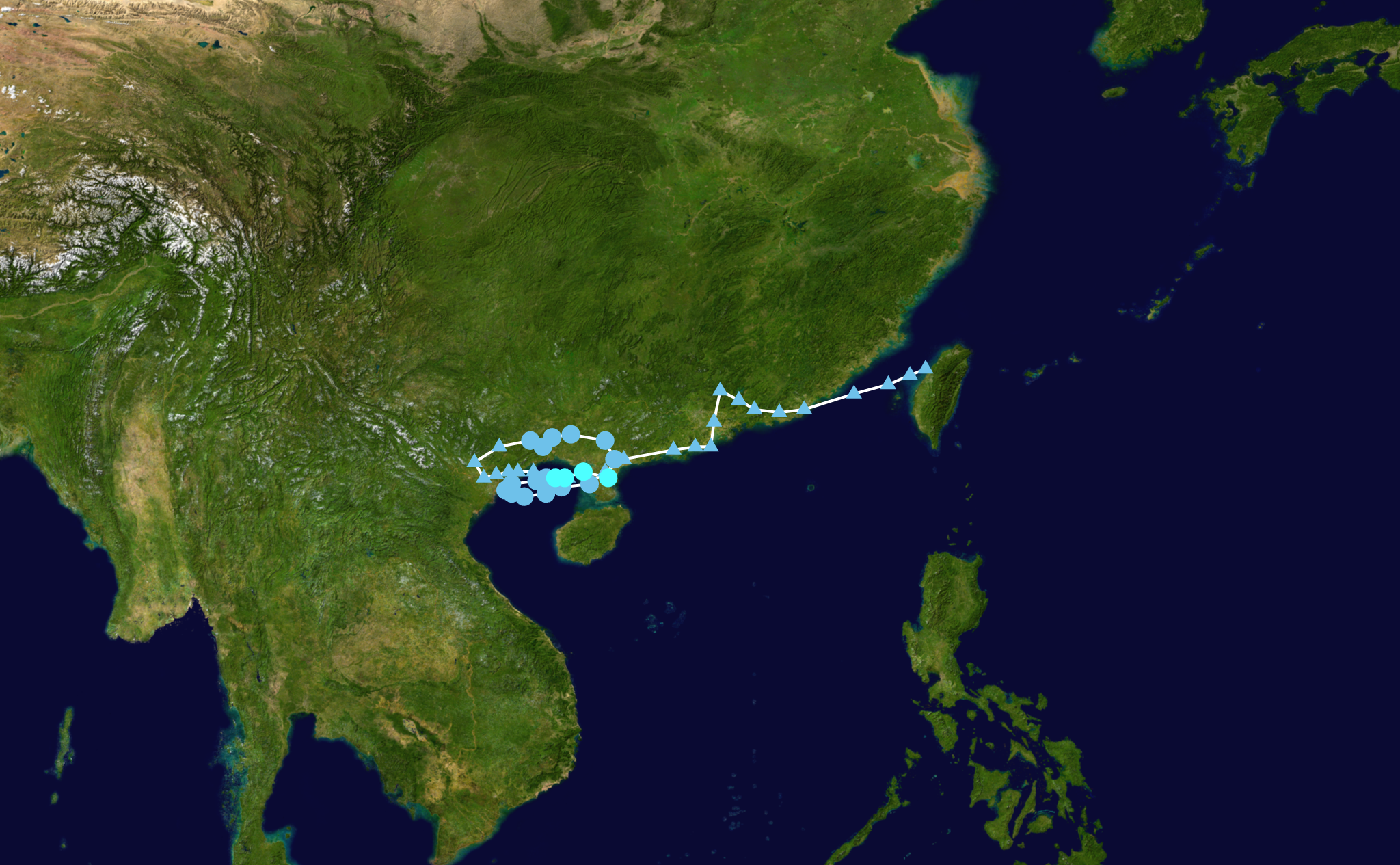
- Duration: August 19 – August 31
- Peak intensity: 90 km/h (55 mph) (10-min); 980 hPa (mbar)

On August 19, a tropical depression formed off the northern coast of Taiwan per the China Meteorological Administration. It would move overland into mainland China the next day, weakening back to a disturbance. After moving inland, it would travel southwestward and meander for several days across the Gulf of Tonkin, before regaining tropical depression strength on August 23. The depression would veer to the east, eventually being classified as a tropical storm on August 25. It would shortly after reach peak intensity as a severe tropical storm, after which it would make landfall on the western side of the Leizhou Peninsula the following day. The storm would curve to the northwest and then back south, reemerging into the Gulf of Tonkin. By that time, it had weakened back into a disturbance, and what remained of the system dissipated on August 31. Despite its marginal intensity, it was not tracked by either the JMA or JTWC.

=== Typhoon Odessa ===
- Typhoon (JMA)
- Category 2 typhoon (SSHWS)
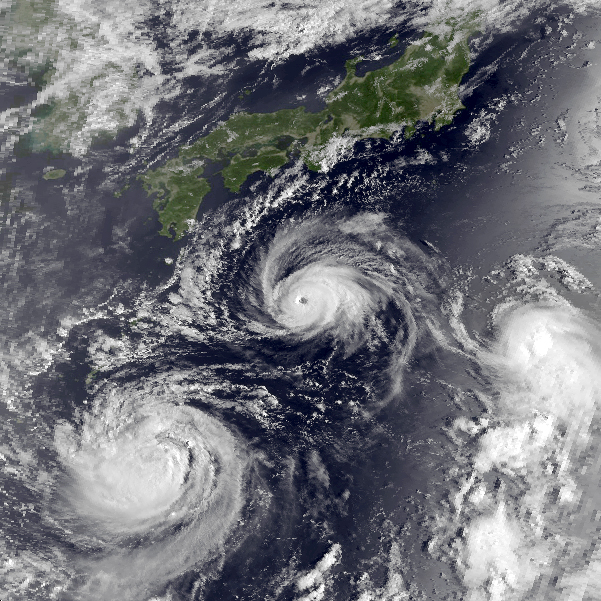
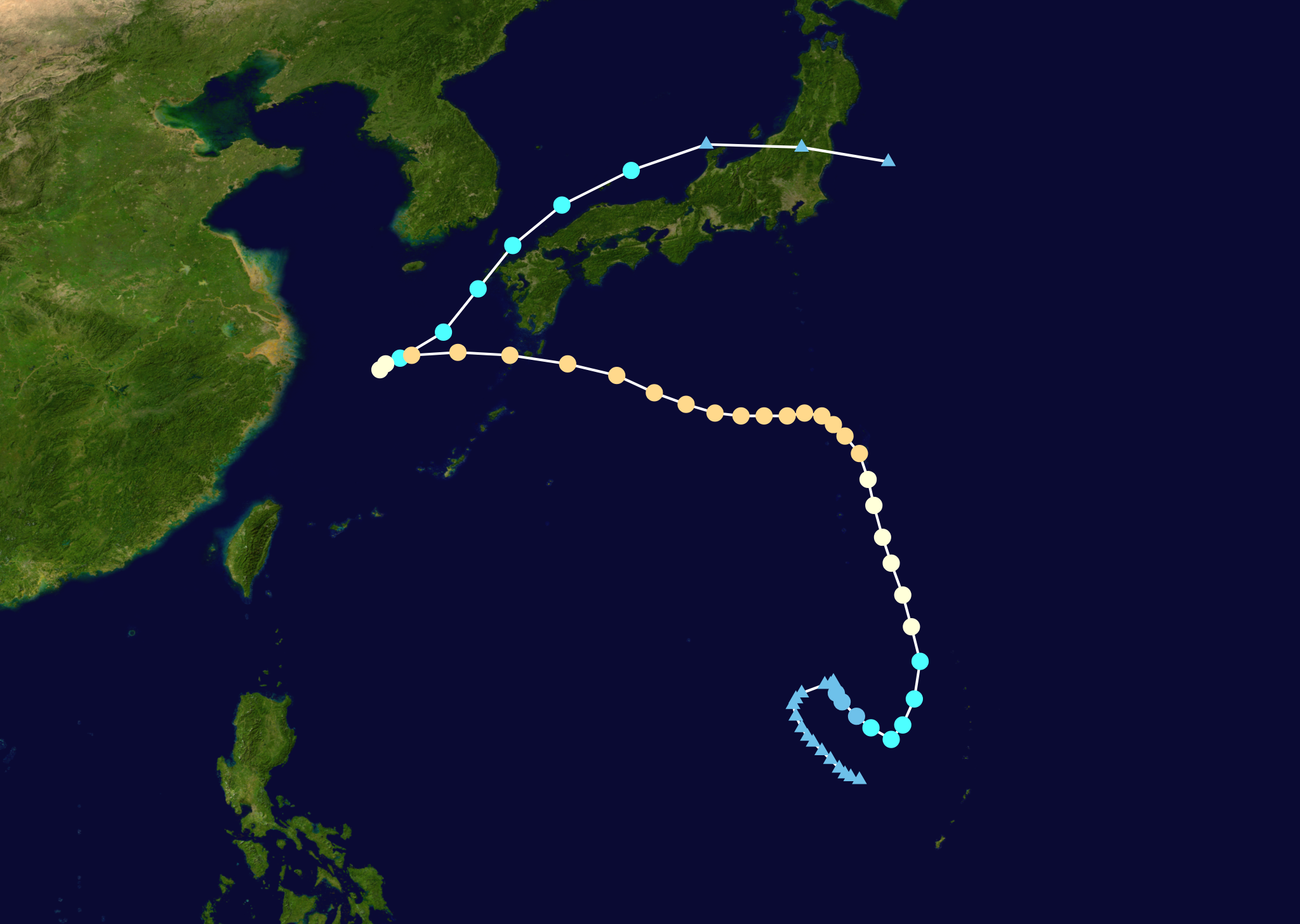
- Duration: August 22 – September 2
- Peak intensity: 150 km/h (90 mph) (10-min); 955 hPa (mbar)

Typhoon Odessa was a tropical system that was active from August 23 through the 1st of September in the Western Pacific Ocean. Odessa was one of three tropical cyclones to exist in the area of Japan at around the same time. Odessa and Pat would pass very close together with Ruby impacting Tokyo. Odessa formed from an area of disturbed weather that persisted on the eastern end of a monsoon trough. The disturbance organized into a depression on August 23 and continued to develop and it was a tropical storm before the day was over. Odessa assumed a northerly track as it continued to strengthen, reaching typhoon intensity late on October 24. Odessa had become a compact storm with a very symmetrical structure. Its eye was very well defined, despite its peak intensity of 90 knots (100 mph; 170 km/h). Odessa was observed by STS 51 as they passed overhead. Odessa was one of the most powerful, circular tropical cyclone patterns ever seen by spacecraft crew. After moving westward and stalling southwest of Japan, it turned the northeast, travelling along the south-western coast of Japan, weakening along the way, before becoming extratropical on September 1.

=== Typhoon Pat (Luming) ===
- Typhoon (JMA)
- Category 2 typhoon (SSHWS)
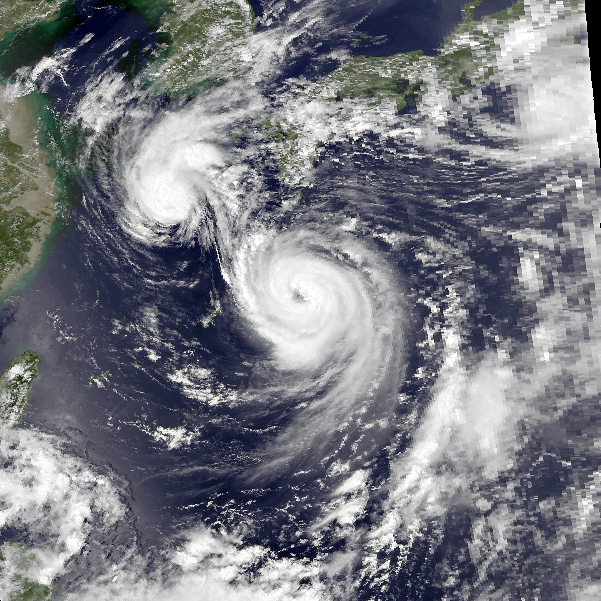
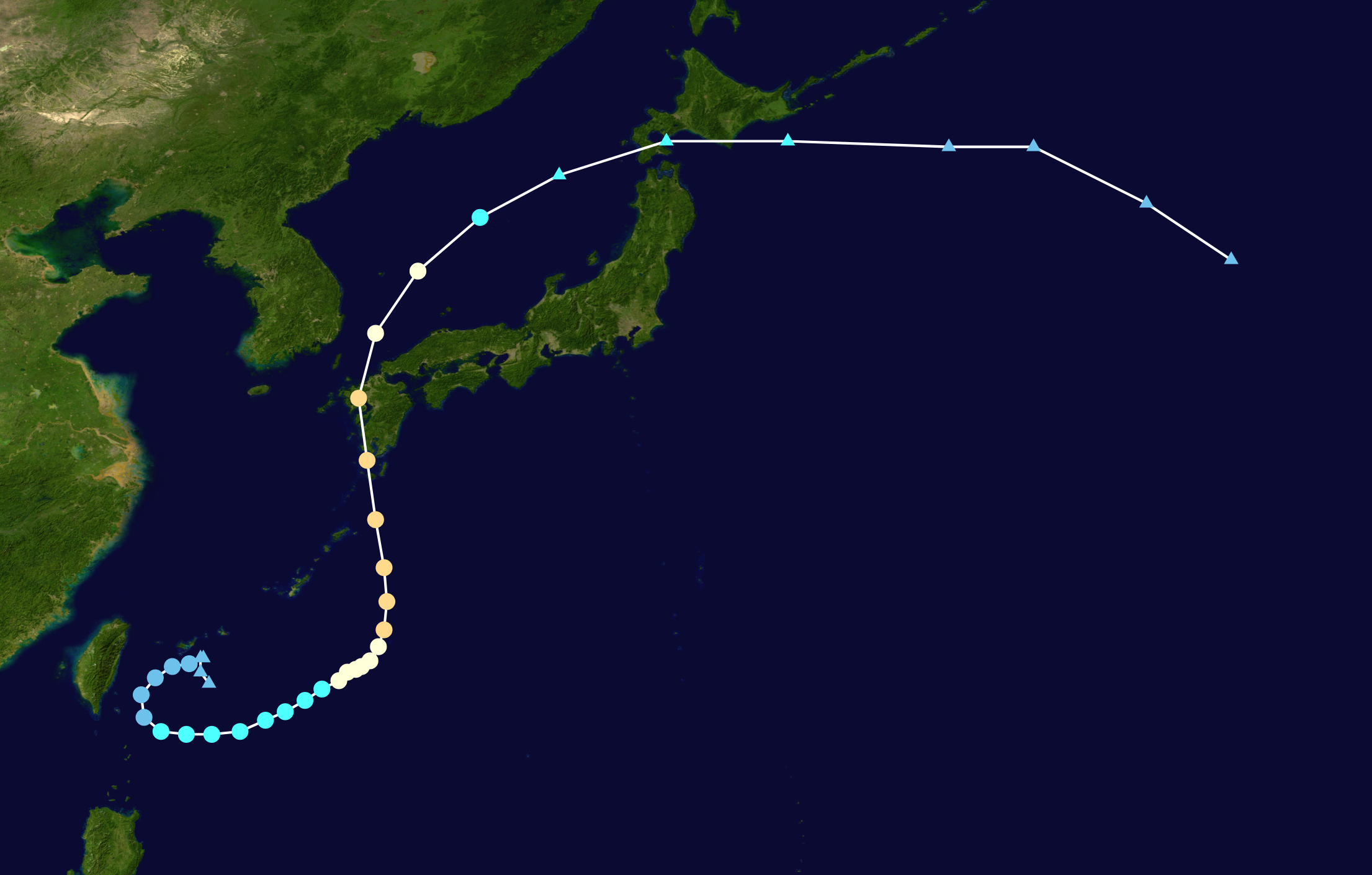
- Duration: August 24 – September 1
- Peak intensity: 140 km/h (85 mph) (10-min); 955 hPa (mbar)

Typhoon Pat developed from the monsoon trough situated to the east of Taiwan on August 27. Pat quickly was upgraded to tropical storm status and was named. Due to a probable Fujiwhara Interaction between Pat and Typhoon Odessa, Pat moved toward the northeast. Just before making a turn towards the northwest Pat was upgraded to a typhoon on the 28th. Typhoon Pat began to accelerate in the direction of Japan. Pat made landfall on southern Kyūshū on the 30th before accelerating through the Sea of Japan and turning extratropical. Pat killed 23 people through Kyūshū and Hokkaidō and destroyed 3,000 homes.

=== Severe Tropical Storm Ruby ===
- Severe tropical storm (JMA)
- Tropical storm (SSHWS)
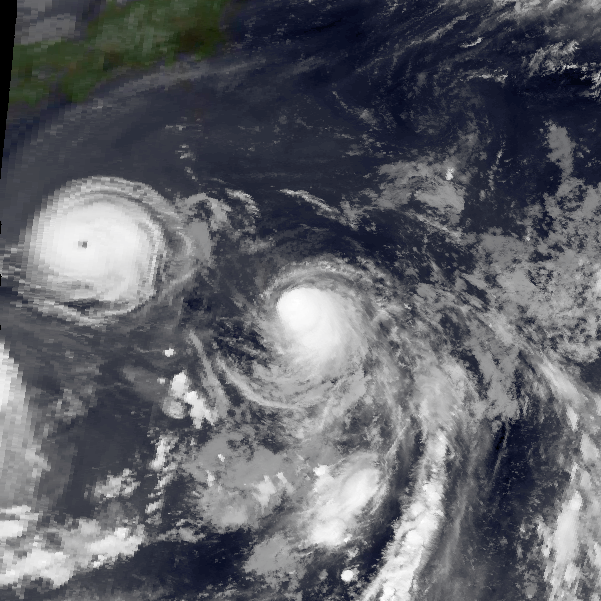
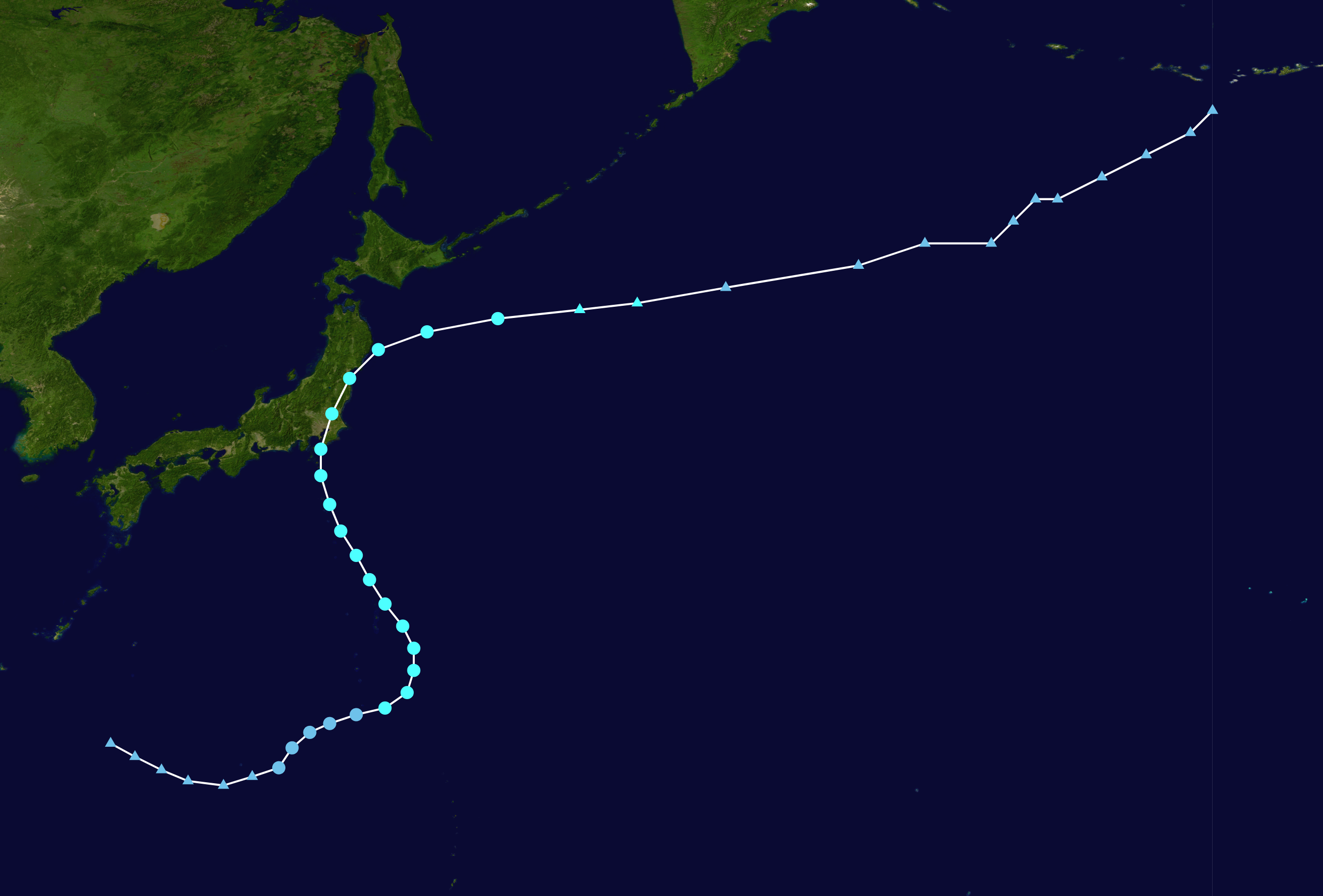
- Duration: August 26 – August 31
- Peak intensity: 100 km/h (65 mph) (10-min); 985 hPa (mbar)

Forming east of Odessa and Pat, the initial disturbance developed near a location with an upper-level low interacted with the monsoon trough. The low-pressure area formed on August 25 to the south-southeast of Okinawa, moving around the southern periphery of Odessa and Pat. Thunderstorm activity concentrated near its low level center, and the system rapidly moved through the tropical depression stage into the tropical storm stage on August 26, developing an elliptical eye. Vertical wind shear from Odessa kept Ruby from becoming a typhoon. Weaving its way northward, Ruby moved across Tokyo early on August 31 as it lost its central convection. Later that day, the system evolved into an extratropical cyclone. Six perished due to Ruby. Damage totalled US$14 million (1985 dollars) from Odessa, Pat, and Ruby.

=== Typhoon Skip ===
- Typhoon (JMA)
- Category 1 typhoon (SSHWS)
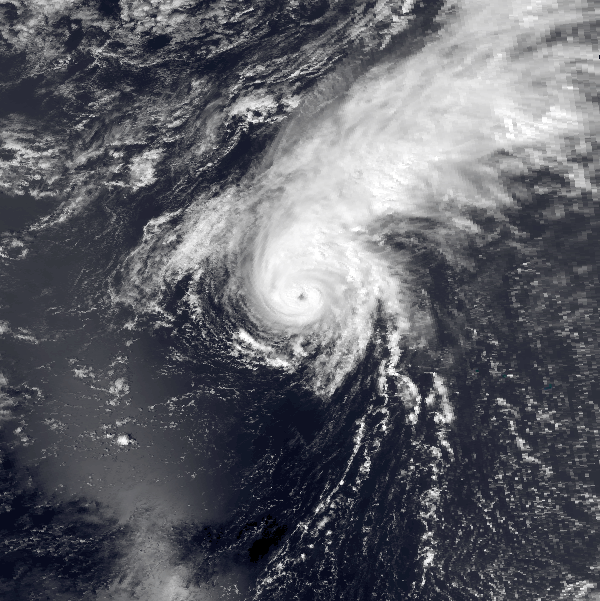
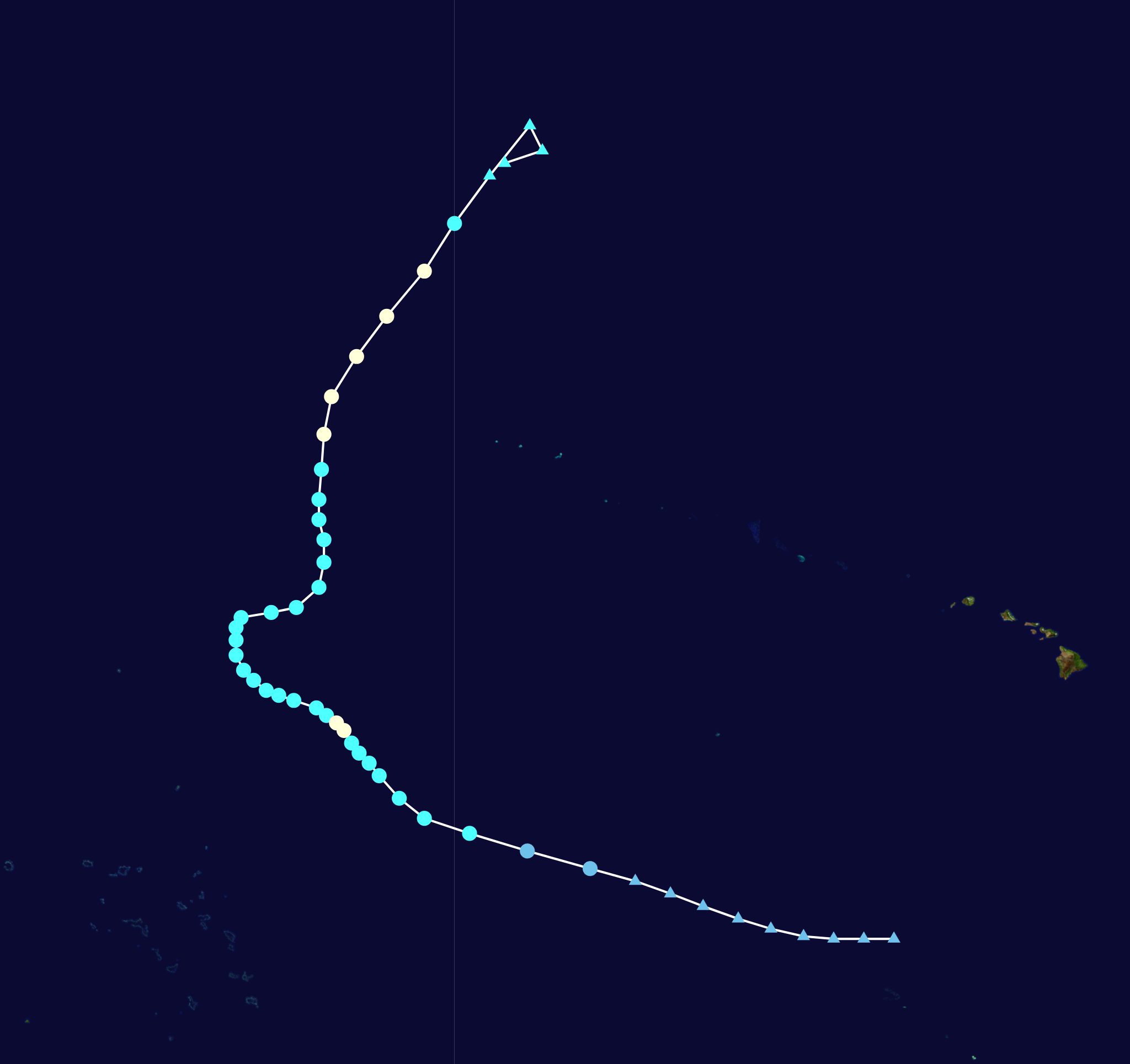
- Duration: August 31 (Entered basin) – September 7 (Exited basin)
- Peak intensity: 140 km/h (85 mph) (10-min); 970 hPa (mbar)

The initial tropical disturbance formed well south of Hawaii along the near-equatorial trough on August 28, moving briskly to the west. The system developed into Tropical Depression Two-C on August 30 and crossed the Date Line the next day at tropical storm strength. It reached typhoon intensity on September 1, while moving northwest. It briefly threatened Wake Island as a typhoon before a Tropical Upper Tropospheric Trough (TUTT) recurved Skip off to the northeast. It then re-crossed the Date Line on September 7, becoming Tropical Storm Skip, while transitioning into an extratropical cyclone.

=== Typhoon Tess (Miling) ===
- Typhoon (JMA)
- Category 1 typhoon (SSHWS)
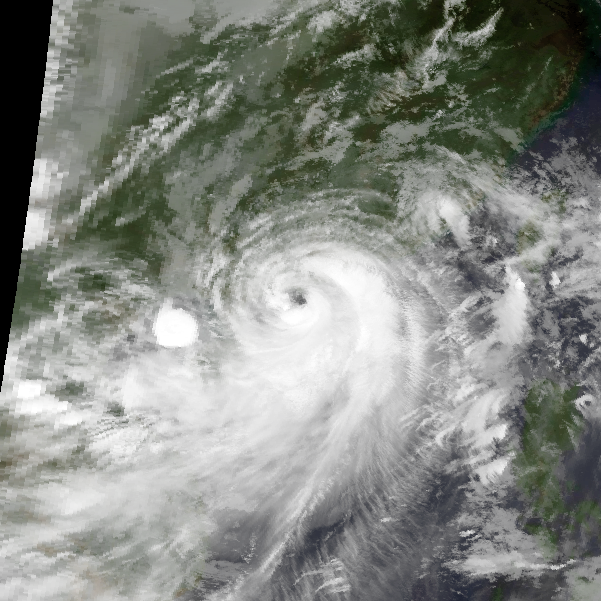
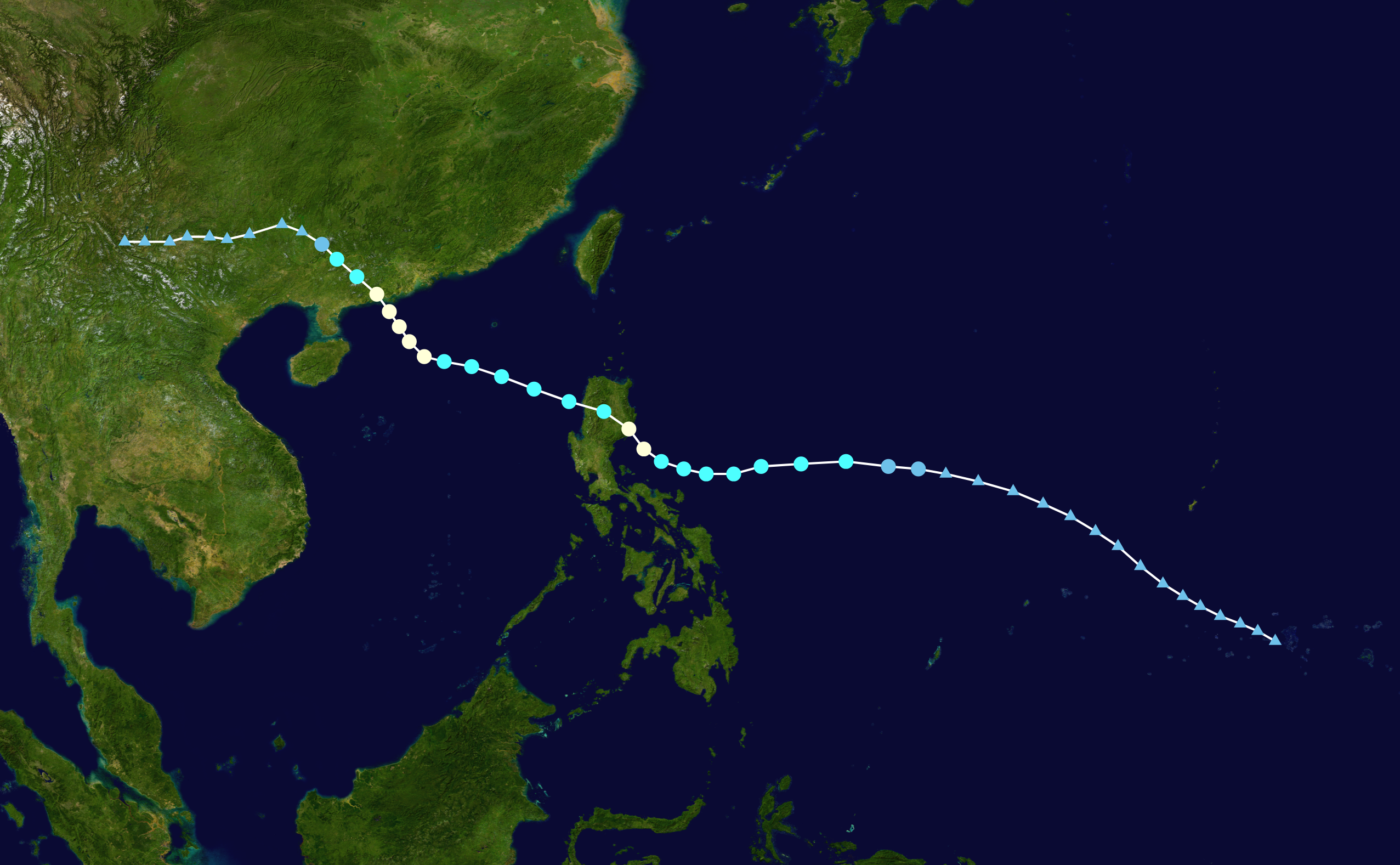
- Duration: September 1 – September 9
- Peak intensity: 130 km/h (80 mph) (10-min); 970 hPa (mbar)

On August 28, a tropical disturbance formed south of Guam. On September 1, the system strengthened into a tropical depression and then tropical storm. Throughout its lifetime, Tess moved generally to the west-northwest. On September 3, Tess became a typhoon just before moving across Luzon, with four perishing from the resultant floods. A tornado was spawned by the system in Lemery. Briefly dropping to tropical storm strength, the cyclone turned to the west upon entering the South China Sea. On September 5, Tess strengthened into a typhoon while moving northwest towards China and Hong Kong. Winds gusted to 65 knots (120 km/h) at Hong Kong's international airport and 88 knots (163 km/h) at Green Island. Tate's Cairn measured 204.4 millimetres (8.05 in) of rainfall. Flooding and crop damage was reported across southern China near where Tess moved inland and dissipated. One person perished in the Philippines, and two in Hong Kong.

=== Tropical Storm Val (Narsing) ===
- Tropical storm (JMA)
- Tropical storm (SSHWS)
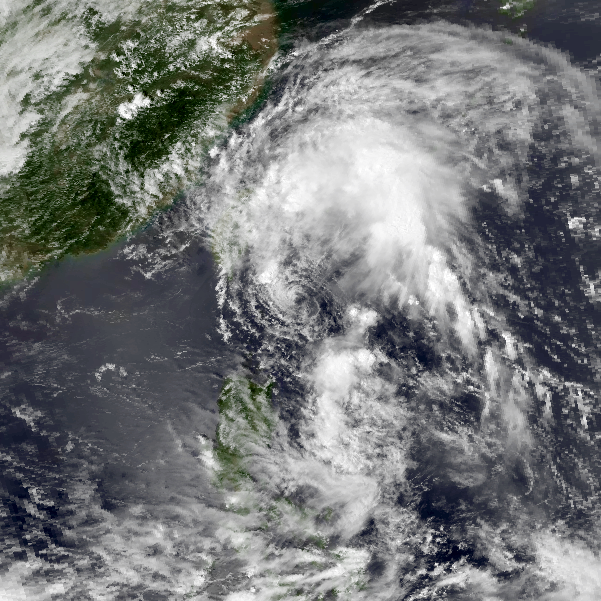
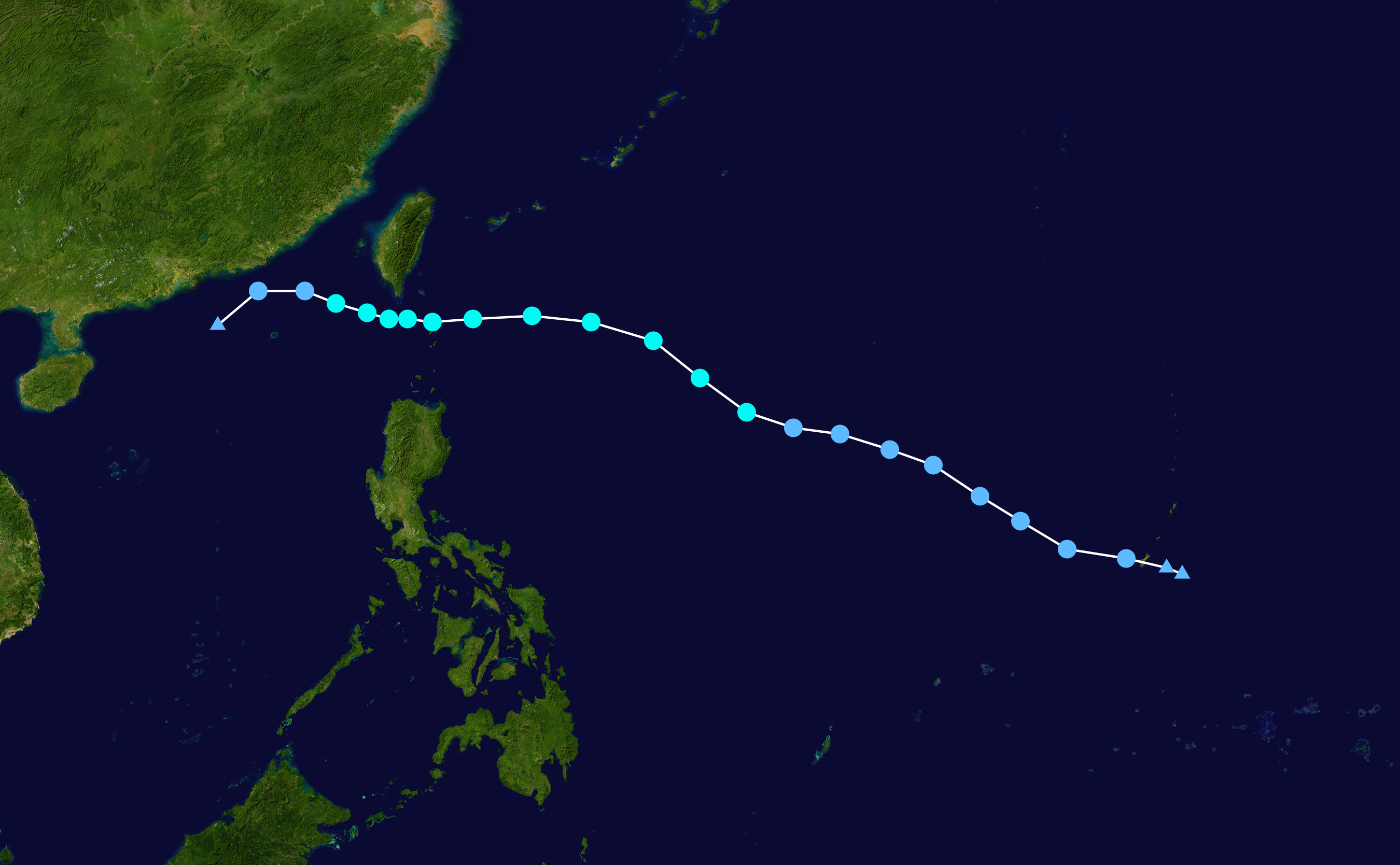
- Duration: September 13 – September 18
- Peak intensity: 85 km/h (50 mph) (10-min); 996 hPa (mbar)

The initial tropical disturbance formed west of Truk/Chuuk within the monsoon trough, and moved northwestward. After developing into a tropical depression early on September 15, the system moved around a west-north-westerly course, becoming a tropical storm on September 15. As Val passed south of Naha, the system turned more westward blocked by the subtropical ridge and passed south of Taiwan, which caused its center to become ill-defined. The resultant tropical depression moved inland into southeast China on September 18. Winds remained below tropical storm force in Hong Kong, and rainfall amounts were light.

=== Tropical Storm Winona ===
- Tropical storm (JMA)
- Tropical storm (SSHWS)
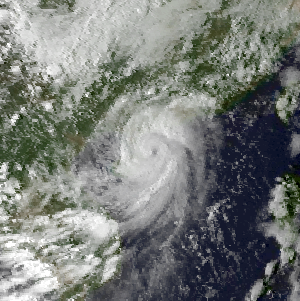
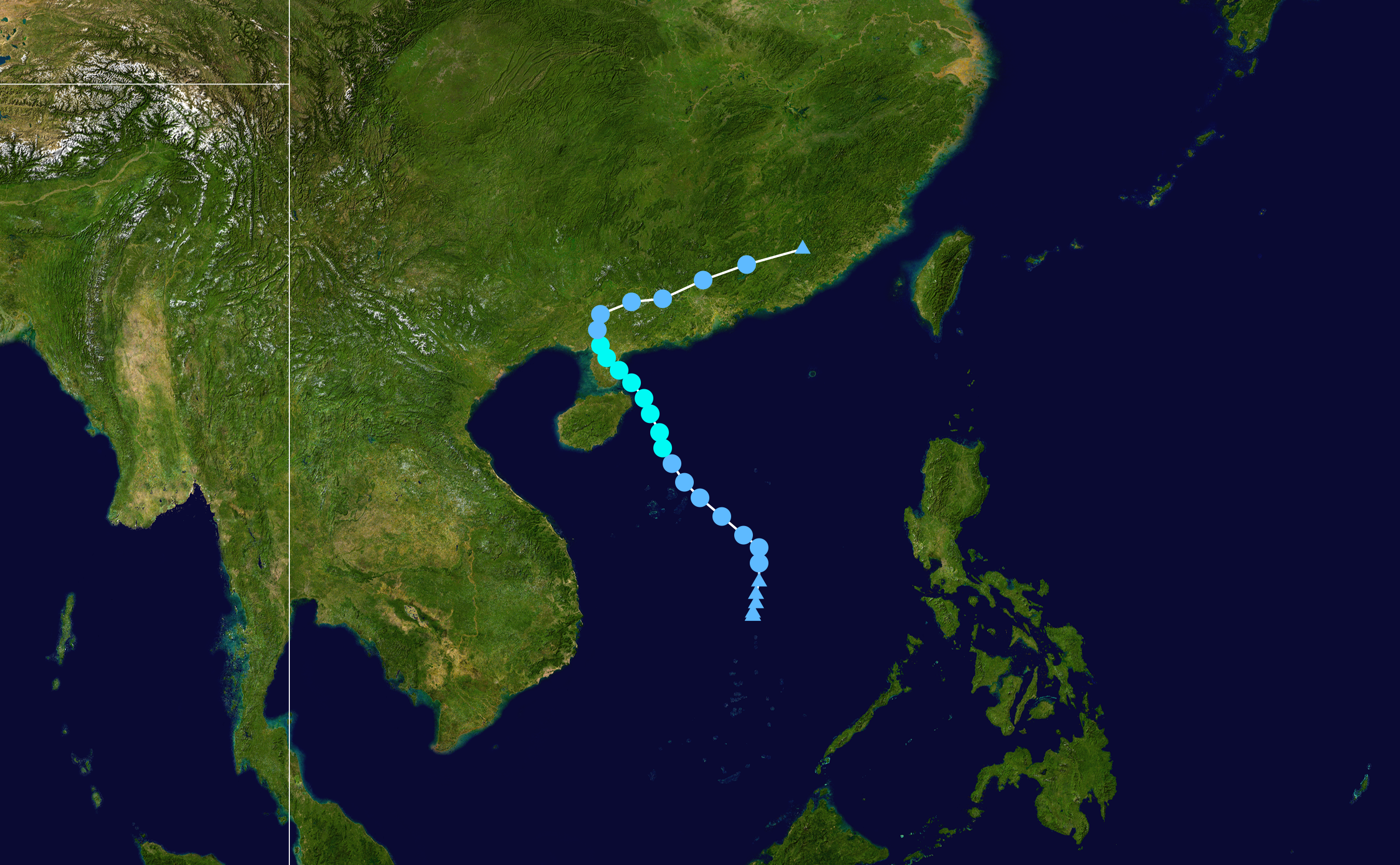
- Duration: September 18 – September 23
- Peak intensity: 85 km/h (50 mph) (10-min); 990 hPa (mbar)

The initial disturbance formed within the South China Sea along the monsoon trough on September 18. Moving northwest, the system developed into a tropical depression on September 19 and a tropical storm on early on September 21. Turning more to the north, Winona missed Hainan Island to the east, and moved into southern China west of Hong Kong on September 22, before quickly dissipating early on September 23. Floods across southeast China trapped 57,000 people, and at least 7500 homes were damaged.

=== Severe Tropical Storm Andy (Openg) ===
- Severe tropical storm (JMA)
- Category 1 typhoon (SSHWS)
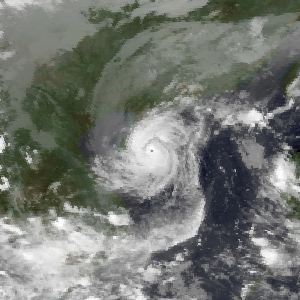
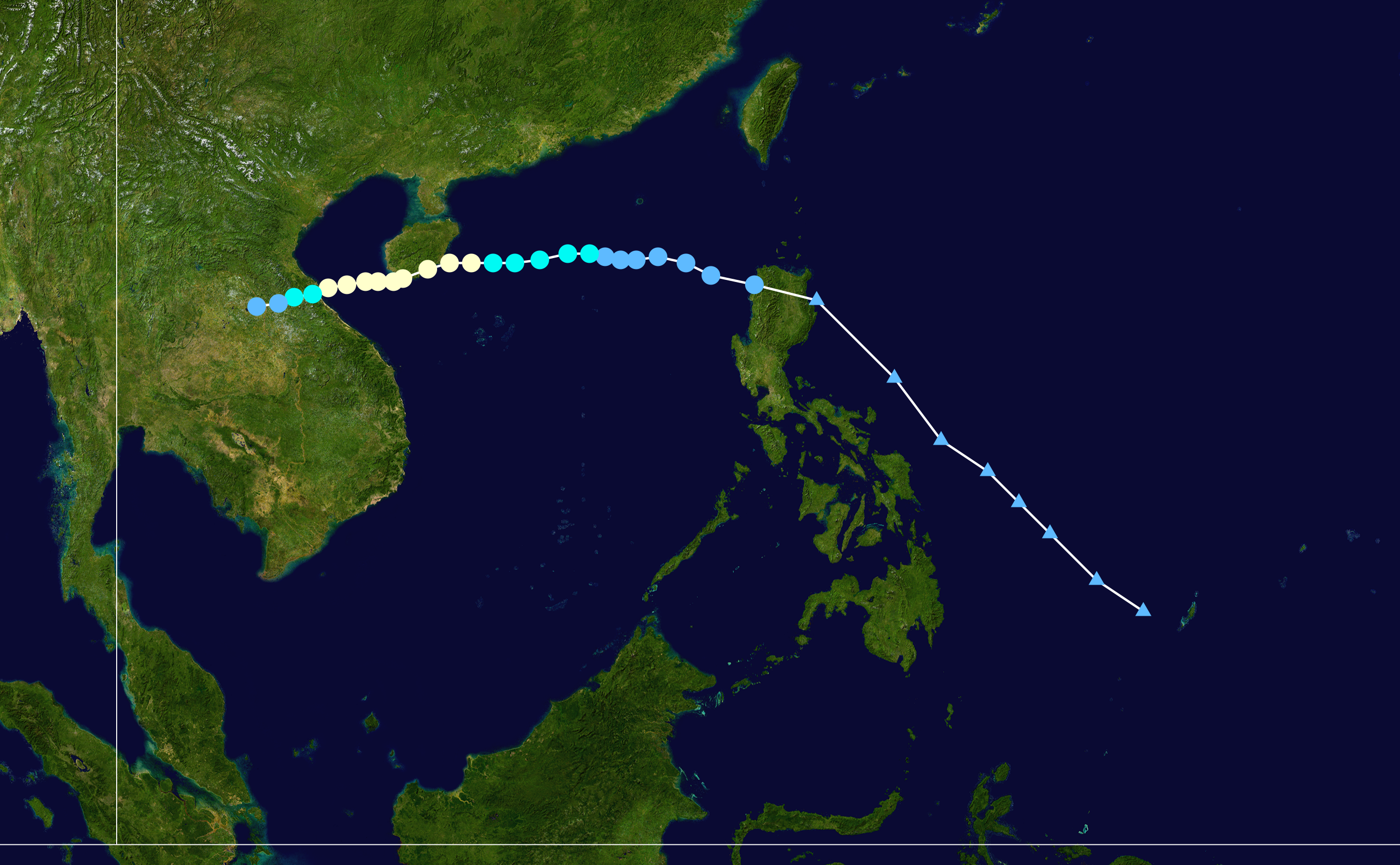
- Duration: September 22 – October 2
- Peak intensity: 100 km/h (65 mph) (10-min); 985 hPa (mbar)

The initial tropical disturbance formed across the Philippine Sea within the monsoon trough on September 25, moving westward across Luzon on September 26. As it moved across the South China Sea, a surge in the northeast flow helped the system develop into a tropical depression on September 27 before strengthening into a tropical storm on September 28. Typhoon intensity was reached on September 29, and its center moved along the south coast of Hainan Island where winds gusted to 80 knots (150 km/h). The storm continued south of due west across the Gulf of Tonkin into Vietnam late on October 1, killing 46 people across central portions of the country. The weakening cyclone crossed central Laos before dissipating in northeast Thailand on October 2.

=== Typhoon Brenda (Pining) ===
- Very strong typhoon (JMA)
- Category 2 typhoon (SSHWS)
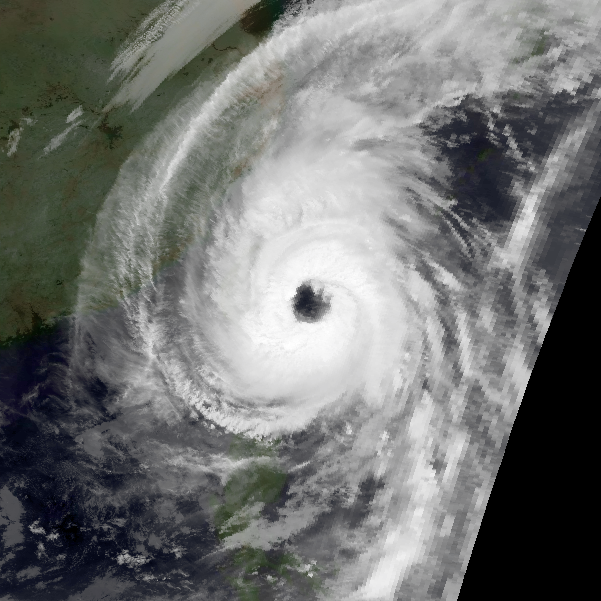
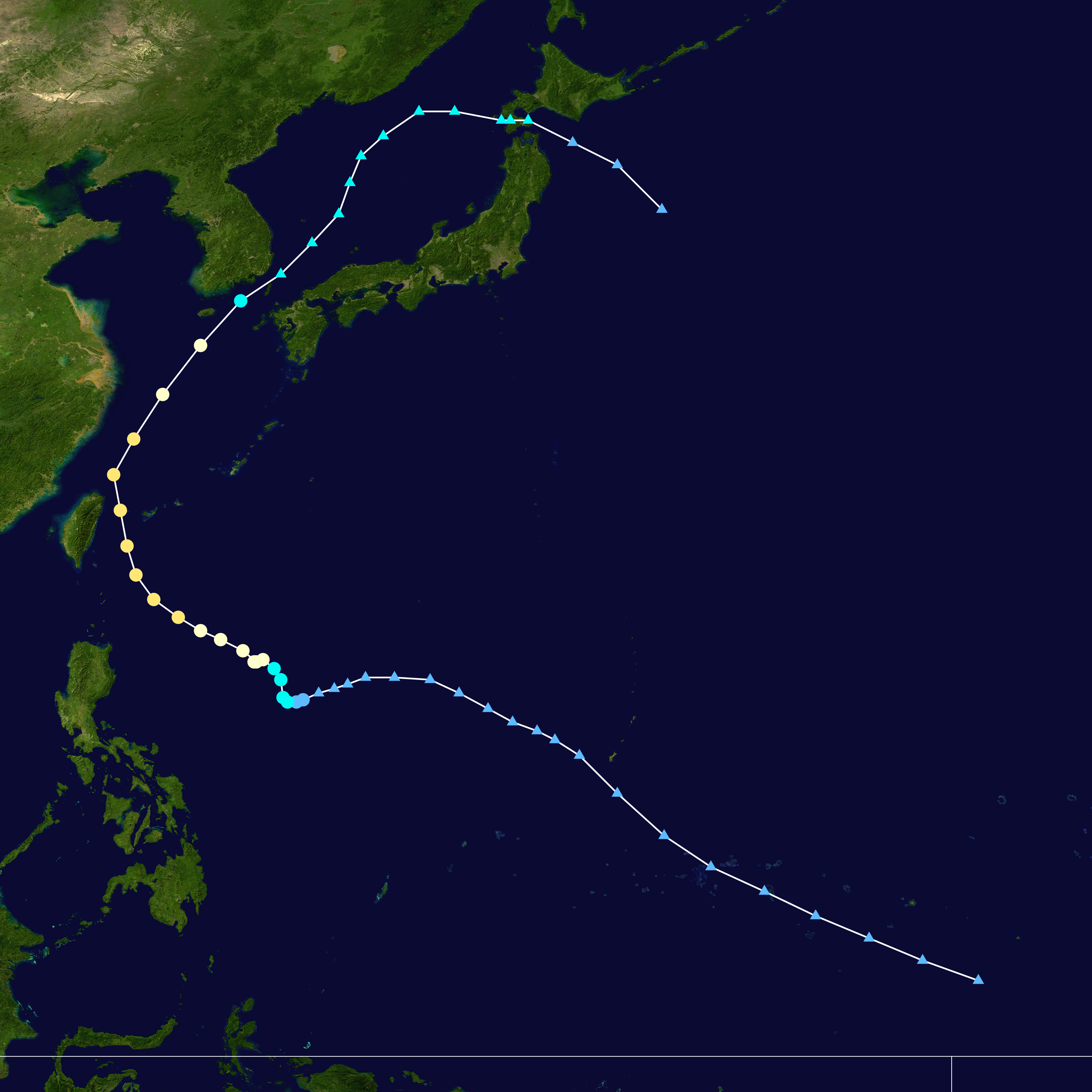
- Duration: September 30 – October 5
- Peak intensity: 155 km/h (100 mph) (10-min); 955 hPa (mbar)

A tropical disturbance was tracked south of Ponape in late September before consolidating into a tropical depression on the 29th to the east of the Philippines. The depression moved towards the west and was named Tropical Storm Brenda on the 30th and became a typhoon the same day. Brenda then completed a small cyclonic loop on 1 October before turning towards the northwest and strengthening to a peak of 105 mph (169 km/h). Brenda turned more northerly and skimmed the southern coast of South Korea before turning extratropical in the Sea of Japan. Nearly 12 inches (300 mm) of rain fell on the South Korean Peninsula heavy flooding on Cheju Island and near Pusan killed 14 people and left 43 missing. The damage from the system totalled US$10 million (1985 dollars).

=== Typhoon Cecil (Rubing) ===
- Typhoon (JMA)
- Category 3 typhoon (SSHWS)
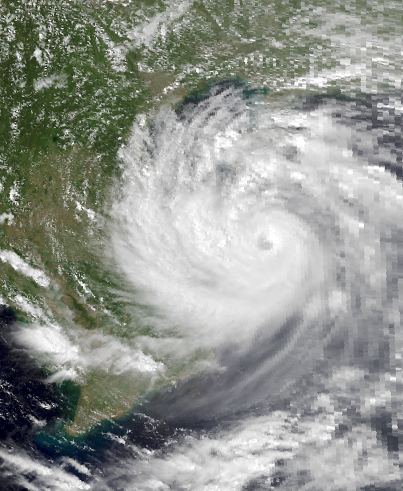
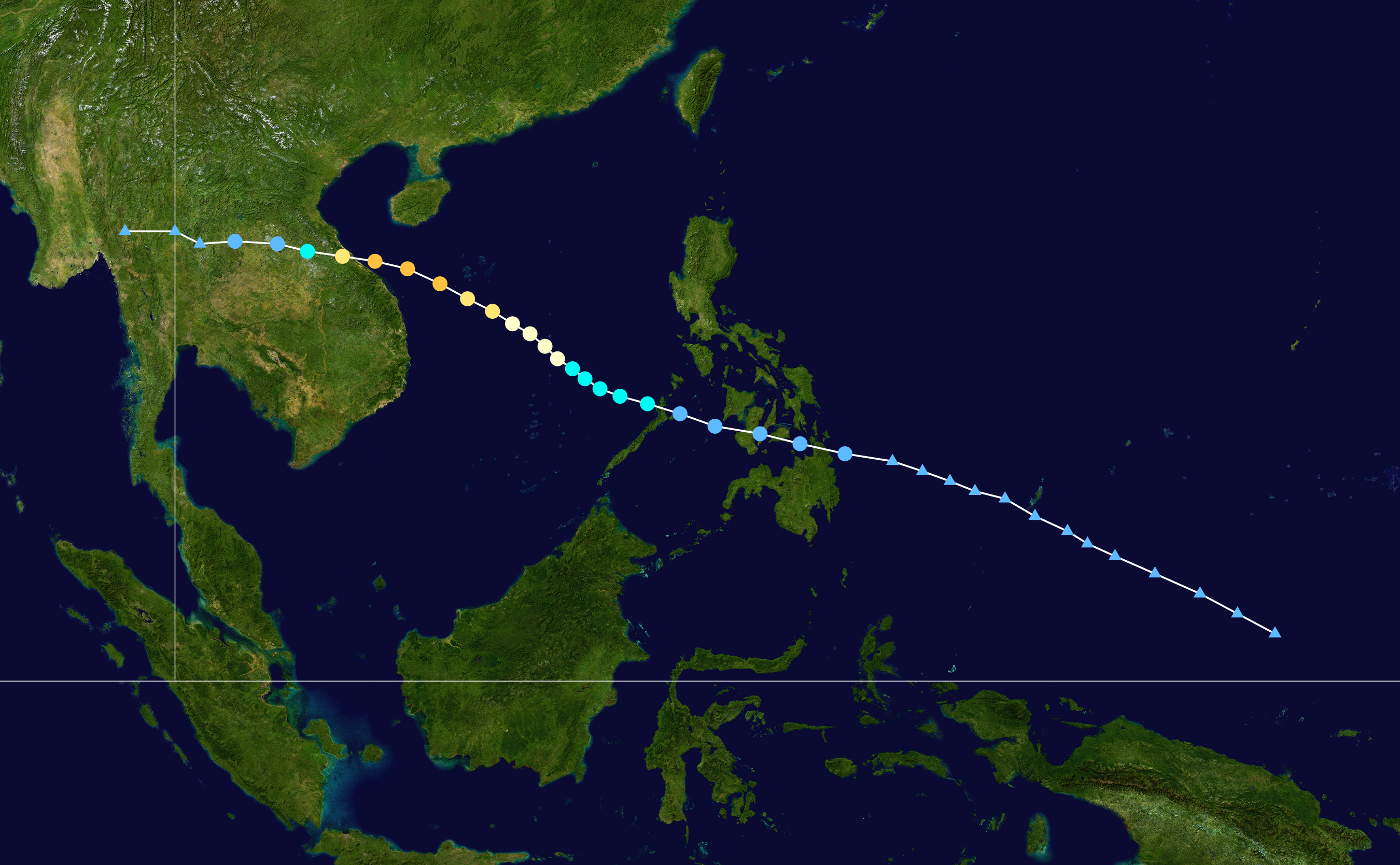
- Duration: October 11 – October 17
- Peak intensity: 150 km/h (90 mph) (10-min); 960 hPa (mbar)

An area of convection organized into a tropical depression on October 12 in the southeastern South China Sea. It tracked to the west-northwest, becoming a tropical storm later that day and a typhoon on the 13th. Cecil continued to intensify, and reached a peak of 115 mph (185 km/h) winds before hitting north-central Vietnam and dissipating on the 16th. Torrential flooding and wind damage to the area caused 702 casualties, with widespread structural and crop damage.

=== Typhoon Dot (Saling) ===
- Violent typhoon (JMA)
- Category 5 super typhoon (SSHWS)
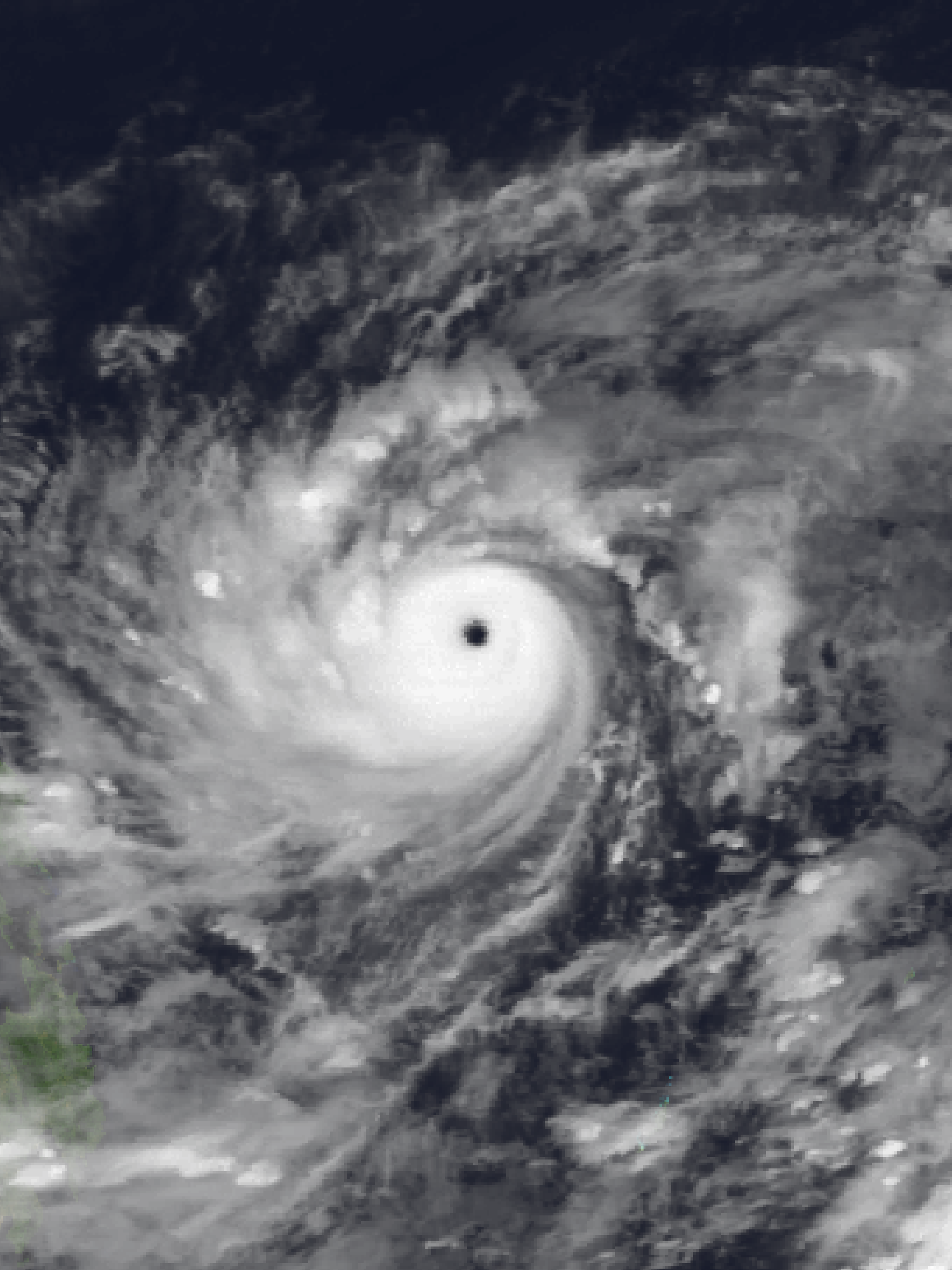
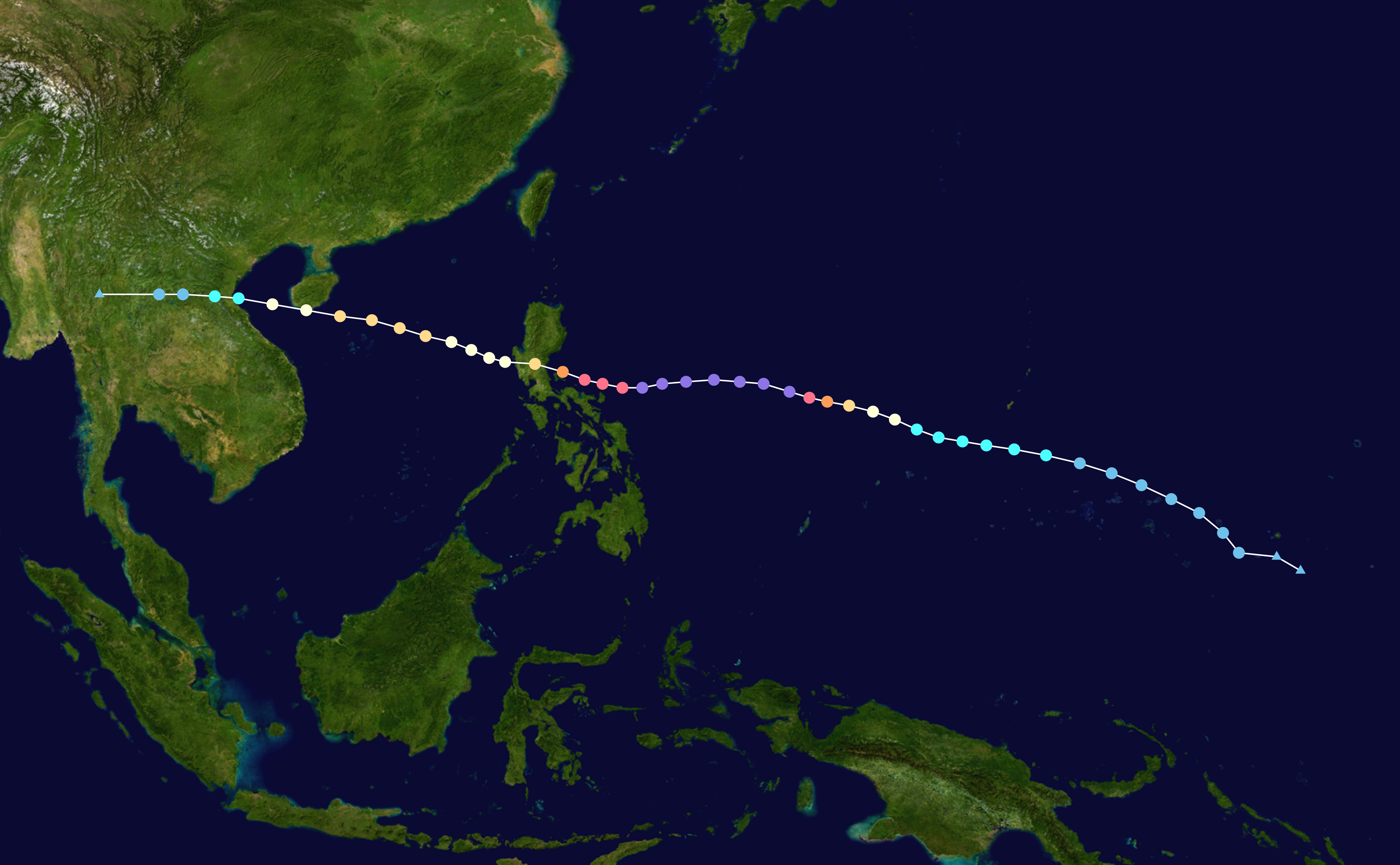
- Duration: October 11 – October 22
- Peak intensity: 220 km/h (140 mph) (10-min); 895 hPa (mbar)

The monsoon trough spawned a tropical depression over the open West Pacific on October 11. It headed west-northwestward, strengthening to a tropical storm on the 13th and a typhoon on the 14th. Dot rapidly intensified to a 175 mph (282 km/h) Super Typhoon on the 16th, the only one of the year, and steadily weakened until hitting eastern Luzon as a 130 mph (210 km/h) typhoon on the 18th. It crossed the South China Sea and hit southern Hainan Island. In Hong Kong, winds gusted to 61 knots (113 km/h) at Tate's Cairn, but rainfall amounts were light as the system mainly bypassed the protectorate to the south. Dot made its final landfall on northern Vietnam on the 21st as a 70 mph (110 km/h) tropical storm. Dot caused 101 fatalities and 2.13 billion Philippine Pesos (1987 pesos) in damage, or US$103.6 million (1987 dollars).

=== Severe Tropical Storm Ellis ===
- Severe tropical storm (JMA)
- Tropical storm (SSHWS)
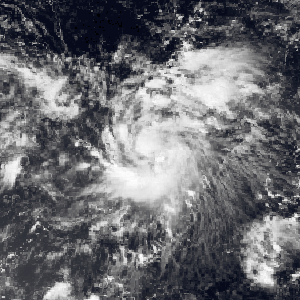
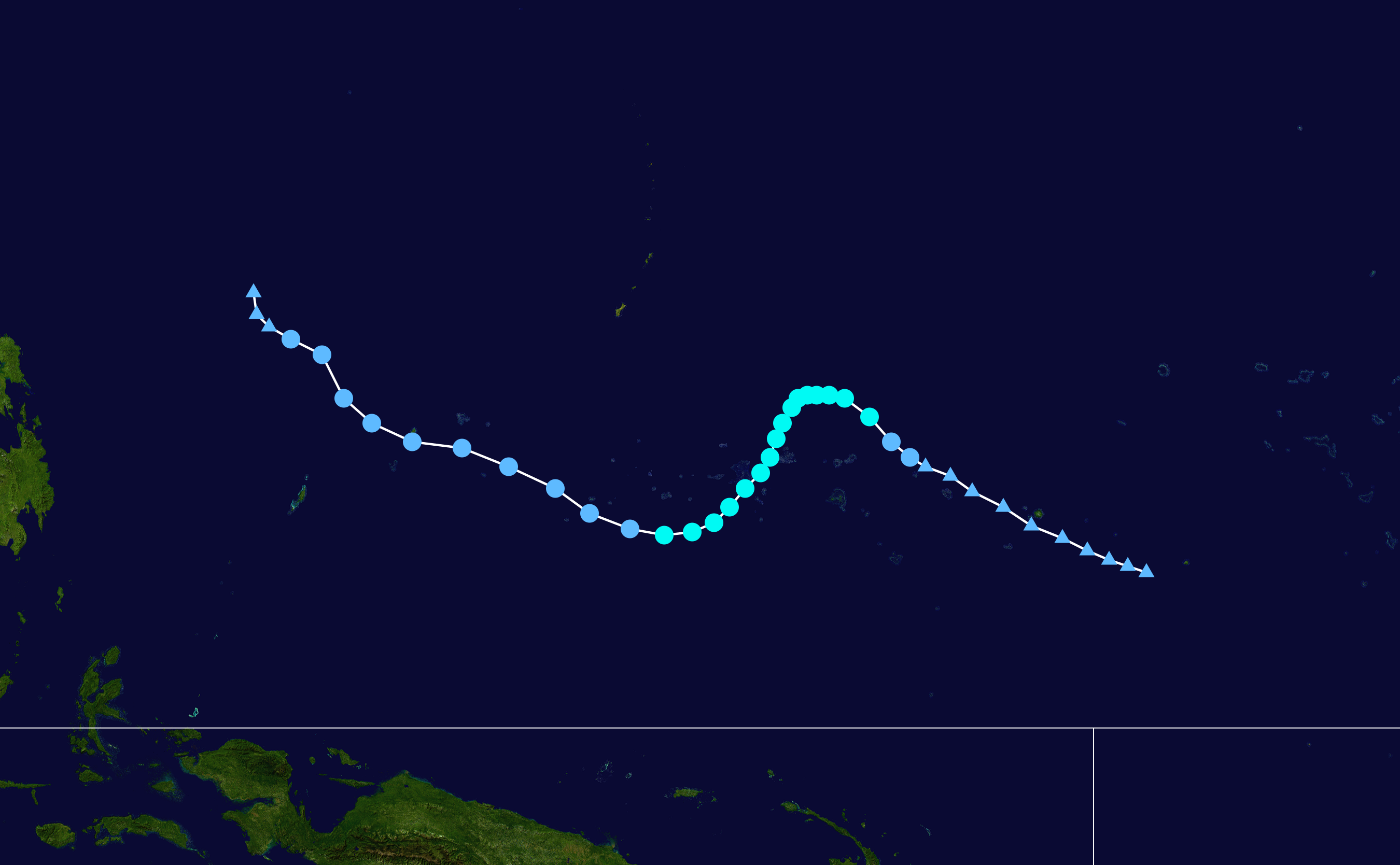
- Duration: October 15 – October 23
- Peak intensity: 95 km/h (60 mph) (10-min); 996 hPa (mbar)

The initial disturbance formed west of Kosrae on October 13, moving west-northwest. Slow to organize, the system evolved into a tropical depression on October 16 and a tropical storm late that day. Soon afterwards, Ellis turned westward and slowed due to a weakness in the subtropical ridge to its north caused by a system passing well to the north of Ellis. The storm turned southwest on October 17 due to the building in of a stronger high pressure system to its northwest. By October 20, Ellis weakened into a tropical depression while resuming a westward course as it passed under an upper-level low which increased vertical wind shear and disrupted its associated thunderstorm activity. The cyclone turned west-northwest on October 21 for a couple days before dissipating east of the Philippines.

=== Typhoon Faye (Tasing) ===
- Typhoon (JMA)
- Category 3 typhoon (SSHWS)
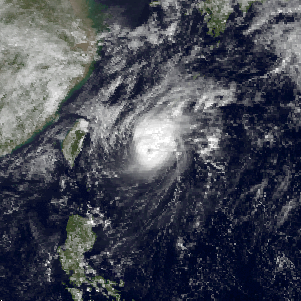
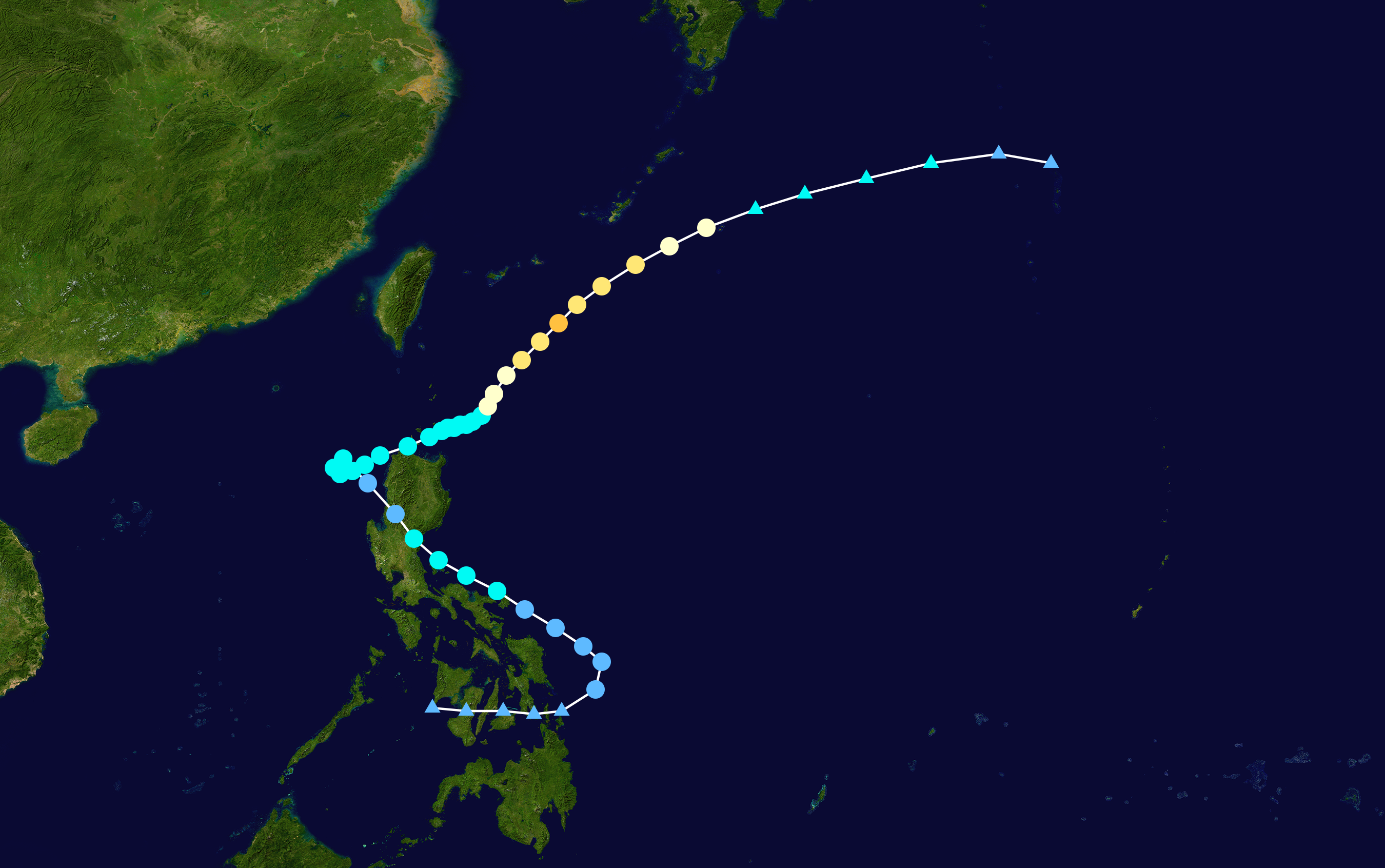
- Duration: October 22 – October 31
- Peak intensity: 140 km/h (85 mph) (10-min); 960 hPa (mbar)

The initial tropical disturbance formed in the South China Sea, and was swept eastward through the Philippines due to Dot's movement to its north. The system emerged east of the Philippines and developed into a tropical depression and tropical storm on October 23. Turning northwest, Faye crossed central Luzon on October 24, weakening back into a tropical depression. Back in the South China sea, Faye regained tropical storm strength. The cyclone made a small cyclonic loop between October 25 and October 26 as a system over China approached Faye from the northwest. The tropical cyclone accelerated east-northwest, passing just north of Luzon. By October 28, Faye's motion slowed and the system strengthened into a typhoon early on October 29. After passing Okinawa, strong westerly winds aloft caused the typhoon to begin to weaken. Early on November 1, Faye weakened into a tropical storm before it evolved into an extratropical cyclone later that day.

=== Tropical Storm Gordon ===
- Tropical storm (JMA)
- Tropical storm (SSHWS)
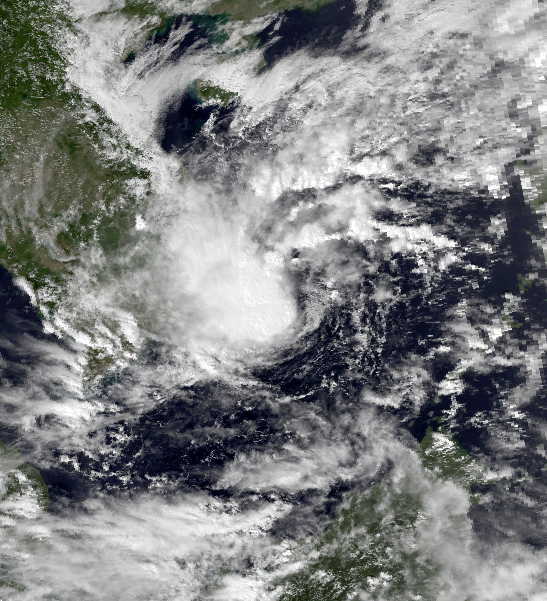
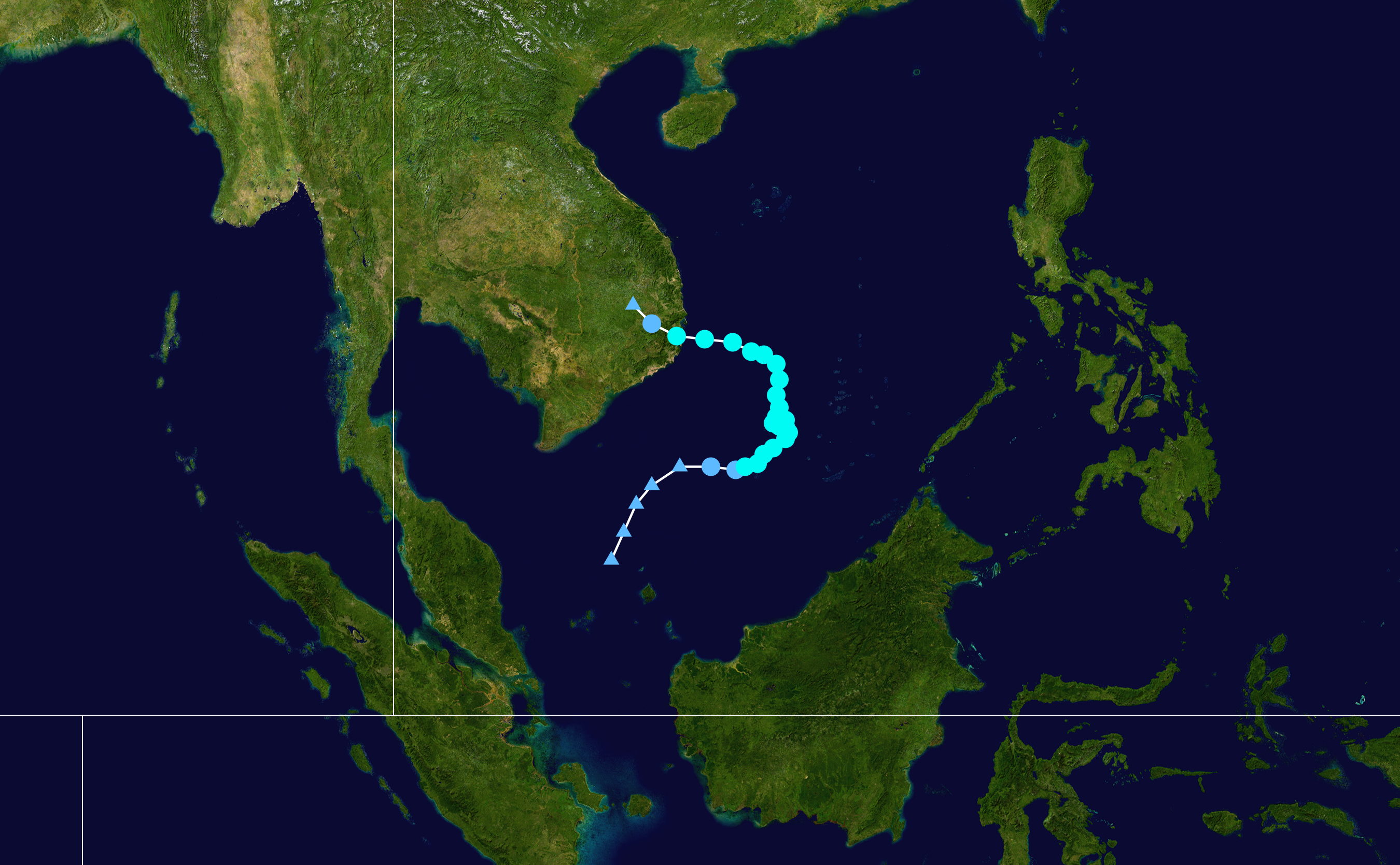
- Duration: November 20 – November 26
- Peak intensity: 75 km/h (45 mph) (10-min); 998 hPa (mbar)

The initial disturbance formed in the southern South China Sea and moved eastward. Its initial intensification to a tropical storm was caused by a surge in the northeast flow to its north and west, and the system turned to the north. As the cyclone became warm core, Gordon was able to restrengthen into a tropical storm after the monsoon wind surge slackened. Throughout its life cycle, thunderstorm activity was removed to the northwest of Gordon's low level circulation. Soon after becoming a tropical storm again, Gordon turned to the west-northwest and made landfall in Vietnam.

=== Typhoon Hope (Unsing) ===
- Very strong typhoon (JMA)
- Category 3 typhoon (SSHWS)
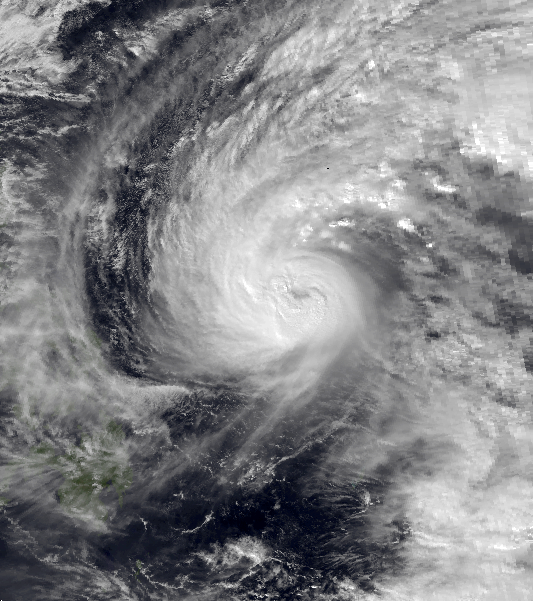
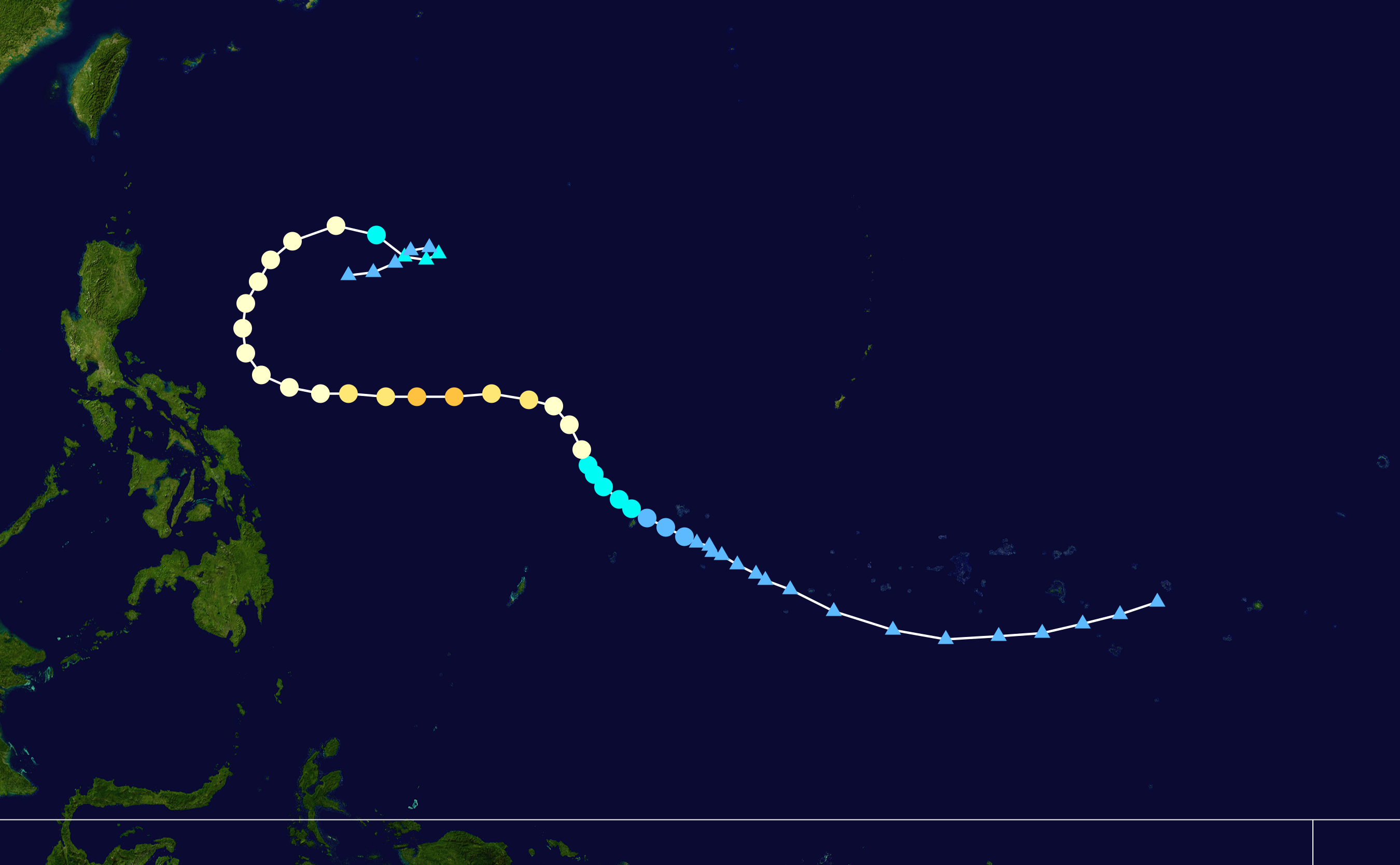
- Duration: December 17 – December 23
- Peak intensity: 165 km/h (105 mph) (10-min); 950 hPa (mbar)

A tropical disturbance formed along the near-equatorial trough on December 13 between Truk and Pohnpei. The system moved westward, and slowly developed. By early on December 18, a tropical depression had formed, and intensification continued for the next couple days as Hope became an intense typhoon on the afternoon of December 20. Weakening was seen later that day, and its eye disappeared. The system moved west-northwest, threatening Luzon for a time. Just before landfall, Hope recurved north and eastward, sparing the Philippines, and becoming an extratropical cyclone on December 24.

=== Severe Tropical Storm Irving ===
- Severe tropical storm (JMA)
- Tropical storm (SSHWS)
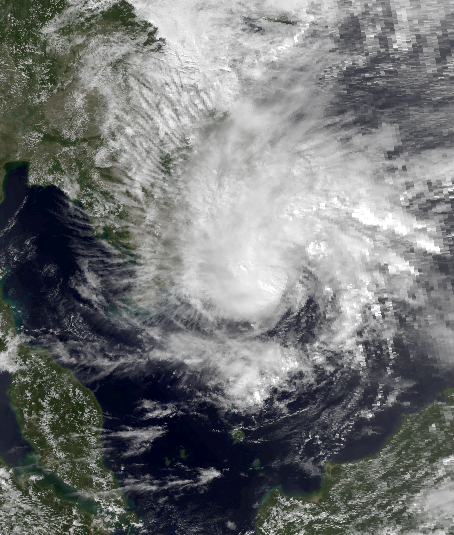
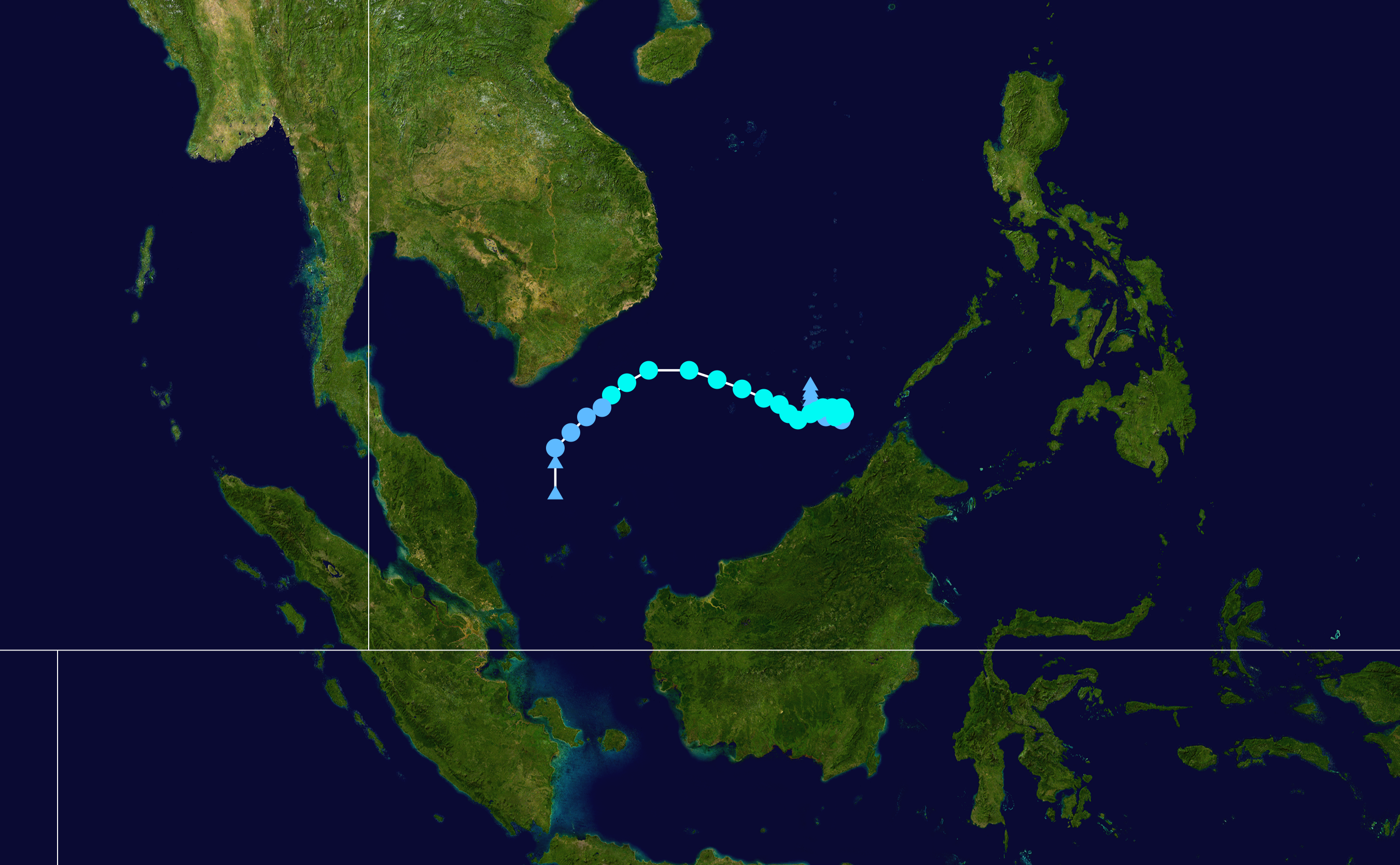
- Duration: December 17 – December 22
- Peak intensity: 95 km/h (60 mph) (10-min); 992 hPa (mbar)

This system formed at the west end of the near-equatorial trough. Winter gales in the South China Sea masked this system's existence. The cyclone was first noted just west of the Philippines on December 18 and moved westward, becoming a tropical storm on December 19. As it approached southern Vietnam, the cyclone turned southwest and weakened, dissipating as it made landfall along the Malay Peninsula.

== Storm names ==
=== International ===
During the season 26 named tropical cyclones developed in the Western Pacific and were named by the Joint Typhoon Warning Center, when it was determined that they had become tropical storms. These names were contributed to a revised list which started in 1979.

Elsie	Fabian	Gay	Hal	Irma	Jeff	Kit	Lee	Mamie	Nelson	Odessa	Pat	Ruby
Skip	Tess	Val	Winona	Andy	Brenda	Cecil	Dot	Ellis	Faye	Gordon	Hope	Irving

=== Philippines ===
Atring	Bining	Kuring	Daling	Elang
Goring	Huling	Ibiang	Luming	Miling
Narsing	Openg	Pining	Rubing	Saling
Tasing	Unsing	Walding (unused)	Yeyeng (unused)	
Auxiliary list
				Anding (unused)
Binang (unused)	Kadiang (unused)	Dinang (unused)	Epang (unused)	Gundang (unused)

The Philippine Atmospheric, Geophysical and Astronomical Services Administration uses its own naming scheme for tropical cyclones in their area of responsibility. PAGASA assigns names to tropical depressions that form within their area of responsibility and any tropical cyclone that might move into their area of responsibility. Should the list of names for a given year prove to be insufficient, names are taken from an auxiliary list, the first 6 of which are published each year before the season starts. Names not retired from this list will be used again in the 1989 season. This is the same list used for the 1981 season. PAGASA uses its own naming scheme that starts in the Filipino alphabet, with names of Filipino female names ending with "ng" (A, B, K, D, etc.). Names that were not assigned/going to use are marked in gray.

== Season effects ==
This is a table of all of the storms that have formed in the 1985 Pacific typhoon season. It includes their duration, names, affected areas, damages, and death totals. Deaths in parentheses are additional and indirect (an example of an indirect death would be a traffic accident), but were still related to that storm. Damage and deaths include totals while the storm was extratropical, a wave, or a low, and all of the damage figures are in 1985 USD. Names listed in parentheses were assigned by PAGASA.

Name	Dates	Peak intensity			Areas affected	Damage (USD)	Deaths	Ref(s).
Name	Dates	Category	Wind speed	Pressure	Areas affected	Damage (USD)	Deaths	Ref(s).
Fabian (Atring)	January 4–13	Severe tropical storm	95 km/h (60 mph)	990 hPa (29.23 inHg)	Caroline Islands	None	None	
Elsie	January 7–11	Tropical storm	65 km/h (40 mph)	1,000 hPa (29.53 inHg)	Caroline Islands, Mariana Islands	None	None	
TD	April 21–26	Tropical depression	Not specified	1,000 hPa (29.53 inHg)	None	None	None	
TD	April 21–23	Tropical depression	Not specified	1,004 hPa (29.65 inHg)	Philippines	None	None	
Gay (Bining)	May 20–26	Typhoon	150 km/h (95 mph)	950 hPa (28.05 inHg)	Japan	None	None	
TD	May 20–21	Tropical depression	Not specified	1,004 hPa (29.65 inHg)	Mariana Islands	None	None	
TD	June 2–3	Tropical depression	Not specified	1,000 hPa (29.53 inHg)	Taiwan, Ryukyu Islands	None	None	
04W	June 14–22	Tropical storm	65 km/h (40 mph)	990 hPa (29.23 inHg)	South China, Vietnam	None	None	
TD	June 17–19	Tropical depression	Not specified	1,002 hPa (29.59 inHg)	Taiwan, Ryukyu Islands	None	None	
Hal (Kuring)	June 19–27	Typhoon	150 km/h (95 mph)	960 hPa (28.35 inHg)	Philippines, Taiwan, China	$10.5 million	53	
Irma (Daling)	June 24 – July 1	Typhoon	150 km/h (95 mph)	955 hPa (28.20 inHg)	Japan	$80 million	49	
TD	June 28 – July 2	Tropical depression	Not specified	998 hPa (29.47 inHg)	Taiwan, South China	None	None	
07W (Elang)	July 4–8	Tropical depression	55 km/h (35 mph)	998 hPa (29.47 inHg)	Philippines, Taiwan, South China	None	None	
TD	July 5–7	Tropical depression	Not specified	1,004 hPa (29.65 inHg)	Philippines, Taiwan, South China	None	None	
TD	July 10–12	Tropical depression	Not specified	1,004 hPa (29.65 inHg)	Philippines	None	None	
TD	July 12	Tropical depression	Not specified	1,006 hPa (29.71 inHg)	Mariana Islands	None	None	
TD	July 12–15	Tropical depression	Not specified	1,006 hPa (29.71 inHg)	None	None	None	
TD	July 13–15	Tropical depression	Not specified	1,006 hPa (29.71 inHg)	None	None	None	
Jeff (Goring)	July 21 – August 2	Typhoon	130 km/h (80 mph)	965 hPa (28.50 inHg)	Taiwan, Ryukyu Islands, East China, Korean Peninsula	None	265	
TD	July 27–29	Tropical depression	Not specified	1,002 hPa (29.59 inHg)	None	None	None	
Kit	July 31 – August 10	Typhoon	130 km/h (80 mph)	960 hPa (28.35 inHg)	Japan, Korean Peninsula	$3.7 million	12	
Lee (Huling)	August 9–14	Severe tropical storm	110 km/h (70 mph)	975 hPa (28.79 inHg)	Ryukyu Islands, Korean Peninsula	$3.9 million	None	
TD	August 10–16	Tropical depression	Not specified	996 hPa (29.41 inHg)	South China	None	None	
TD	August 13–14	Tropical depression	Not specified	1,006 hPa (29.71 inHg)	None	None	None	
Mamie	August 14–19	Typhoon	120 km/h (75 mph)	975 hPa (28.79 inHg)	Taiwan, East China	None	17	
Nelson (Ibiang)	August 16–25	Typhoon	150 km/h (95 mph)	960 hPa (28.35 inHg)	Taiwan, China	$53 million	55	
TD	August 19–31	Tropical depression	Not specified	994 hPa (29.35 inHg)	Taiwan, China, Vietnam	None	None	
Odessa	August 22 – September 2	Typhoon	150 km/h (95 mph)	955 hPa (28.20 inHg)	Japan, South Korea	None	None	
TD	August 24–26	Tropical depression	Not specified	1,002 hPa (29.59 inHg)	None	None	None	
Pat (Luming)	August 24 – September 1	Typhoon	130 km/h (80 mph)	955 hPa (28.20 inHg)	Japan, Korea	$300 million	23	
Ruby	August 26–31	Severe tropical storm	100 km/h (60 mph)	985 hPa (29.09 inHg)	Japan	$14 million	6	
TD	August 26–27	Tropical depression	Not specified	1,008 hPa (29.77 inHg)	None	None	None	
Skip	August 31 – September 7	Typhoon	110 km/h (70 mph)	970 hPa (28.64 inHg)	Wake Island	None	None	
Tess (Miling)	September 1–9	Typhoon	130 km/h (80 mph)	970 hPa (28.64 inHg)	Taiwan, East China	None	23	
TD	September 1–2	Tropical depression	Not specified	1,000 hPa (29.53 inHg)	South China	None	None	
TD	September 1–2	Tropical depression	Not specified	1,000 hPa (29.53 inHg)	Taiwan, East China, North Korea	None	None	
TD	September 9–11	Tropical depression	Not specified	1,000 hPa (29.53 inHg)	South China, Vietnam	None	None	
Val (Narsing)	September 13–18	Tropical storm	85 km/h (55 mph)	996 hPa (29.41 inHg)	South China, Vietnam	None	None	
TD	September 14–15	Tropical depression	Not specified	1,004 hPa (29.65 inHg)	Vietnam, Cambodia	None	None	
TD	September 15–17	Tropical depression	Not specified	1,002 hPa (29.59 inHg)	Philippines	None	None	
Winona	September 18–23	Tropical storm	85 km/h (55 mph)	990 hPa (29.23 inHg)	South China	None	None	
Andy (Openg)	September 22 – October 2	Severe tropical storm	110 km/h (70 mph)	985 hPa (29.09 inHg)	Mariana Islands, Caroline Islands, Philippines, Taiwan, South China, Vietnam	None	46	
TD	September 23–24	Tropical depression	Not specified	1,006 hPa (29.71 inHg)	Nonen	None	None	
TD	September 24	Tropical depression	Not specified	1,010 hPa (29.83 inHg)	None	None	None	
TD	September 24–25	Tropical depression	Not specified	1,010 hPa (29.83 inHg)	None	None	None	
Brenda (Pining)	September 30 – October 5	Typhoon	155 km/h (95 mph)	955 hPa (28.20 inHg)	Philippines, Taiwan, Japan, Korean Peninsula	$10 million	14	
TD	October 9–13	Tropical depression	Not specified	1,004 hPa (29.65 inHg)	Philippines, Vietnam, Thailand	None	None	
Cecil (Rubing)	October 11–17	Typhoon	140 km/h (85 mph)	960 hPa (28.35 inHg)	Philippines, Vietnam, Laos	Unknown	702	
Dot (Saling)	October 11–22	Violent typhoon	220 km/h (135 mph)	895 hPa (26.43 inHg)	Caroline Islands, Mariana Islands, Philippines, South China, Vietnam	$68 million	90	
Ellis	October 15–23	Severe tropical storm	95 km/h (60 mph)	996 hPa (29.41 inHg)	Caroline Islands	None	None	
Faye (Tasing)	October 22–31	Typhoon	140 km/h (85 mph)	965 hPa (28.50 inHg)	Philippines, Ryukyu Islands	None	None	
TD	October 31 – November 1	Tropical depression	Not specified	1,004 hPa (29.65 inHg)	None	None	None	
Gordon	November 20–26	Tropical storm	75 km/h (45 mph)	998 hPa (29.47 inHg)	Malaysia, Vietnam	None	None	
TD	November 21–22	Tropical depression	Not specified	1,004 hPa (29.65 inHg)	Philippines	None	None	
TD	November 22	Tropical depression	Not specified	1,006 hPa (29.71 inHg)	Philippines	None	None	
Hope (Unsing)	December 17–23	Very strong typhoon	165 km/h (105 mph)	950 hPa (28.05 inHg)	Caroline Islands, Philippines	None	None	
Irving	December 17–22	Severe tropical storm	95 km/h (60 mph)	992 hPa (29.29 inHg)	Vietnam, Malaysia, Borneo, Philippines	None	None	
Season aggregates
57 systems	January 4 – December 23, 1985		220 km/h (135 mph)	895 hPa (26.43 inHg)		>$243 million	1,355	

== See also ==
- List of Pacific typhoon seasons
- Weather of 1985
- 1985 Pacific hurricane season
- 1985 Atlantic hurricane season
- 1985 North Indian Ocean cyclone season
- Australian cyclone seasons: 1984–85, 1985–86
- South Pacific cyclone seasons: 1984–85, 1985–86
- South-West Indian Ocean cyclone seasons: 1984–85, 1985–86
