= Meteorological history of Hurricane Luis =

Hurricane Luis
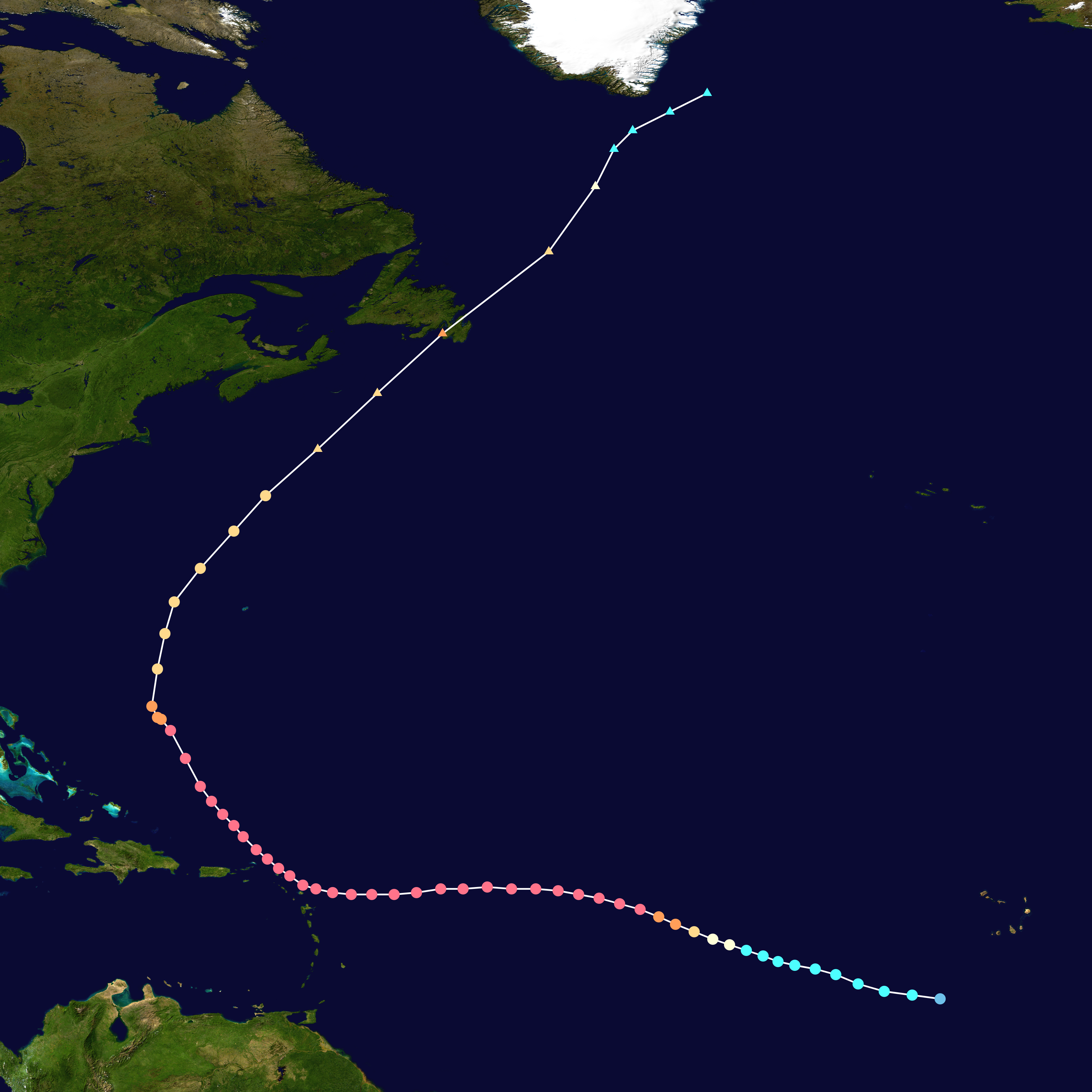
- Track map of Hurricane Luis

Meteorological history
- Formed: August 27, 1995
- Extratropical: September 11
- Dissipated: September 12, 1995

Category 4 major hurricane
- 1-minute sustained (SSHWS/NWS)
- Highest winds: 150 mph (240 km/h)
- Lowest pressure: 935 mbar (hPa); 27.61 inHg

Overall effects
- Areas affected: Leeward Islands (especially Antigua and Barbuda, St. Kitts and Nevis, Sint Eustatius, Saba, Saint Barthélemy, St. Martin and Anguilla), Puerto Rico, Bermuda, parts of the Northeastern USA, Newfoundland
- Part of the 1995 Atlantic hurricane season

The meteorological history of Hurricane Luis spanned sixteen days between August 27 to September 11, 1995. The storm originated from an area of low pressure associated with a tropical wave on August 26. The following day, the low became sufficiently organized to be classified as a tropical depression, while tracking general westward. By August 29, the depression intensified into a tropical storm and was given the name Luis by the National Hurricane Center. Luis attained hurricane status the following day as an eye began to develop. On September 1 the cyclone intensified into a major hurricane—a storm with winds of 111 mph (179 km/h) or higher—and further strengthened to a Category 4 hurricane later that day.

Hurricane Luis maintained wind speeds of 130 mph (210 km/h) for nearly two days and developed a symmetrical structure with a well-defined 46 mi (74 km) wide eye. Early on September 3, winds within the eyewall reached 150 mph (240 km/h). Luis weakened slightly maintained this intensity until September 5, shortly before passing through the Leeward Islands with 130 mph (210 km/h) winds. The hurricane maintained Category 4 status until September 7 as it tracked towards the northwest. Gradual weakening took place for several days and by September 9, the hurricane passed about 200 mi (320 km) west of Bermuda. The next day, Luis began to undergo an extratropical transition and the storm's forward motion rapidly increased. Early on September 11, Luis made landfall on the Avalon Peninsula as a strong Category 1 hurricane with winds of 90 mph (145 km/h). The same day, a 30 metres (98 ft) wave produced by Luis struck an ocean liner. This wave is the largest ever recorded, Several hours later, the storm completed its extratropical transition as it began to be absorbed into an approaching trough. The following day, the remnants of Luis were fully absorbed into the trough near the southern coast of Greenland.

== Formation and intensification ==
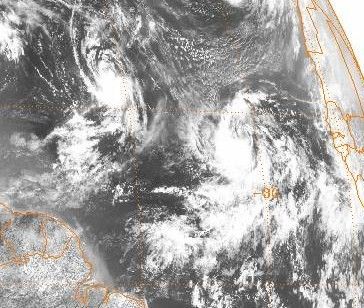
Tropical Storm Luis (right) on August 29

On August 26, the National Hurricane Center (NHC) began monitoring a tropical wave between the western coast of Africa and the Cape Verde Islands. Later that day, a low-level circulation center formed beneath the wave and began strengthening. Convective activity associated with the low became increasingly organized, and at around 1200 UTC on August 27, the NHC classified the system as Tropical Depression Thirteen; at the time, it was located approximately 255 miles (410 kilometres) south-southeast of Praia, Cape Verde. Operationally, the NHC did not begin to issue advisories on the depression until 2100 UTC on August 28. Tracking nearly due west in response to an anticyclone to the north and an area of moderate wind shear, the depression was forecast to slowly strengthen over the next several days. Early on August 29, satellite intensity estimates of maximum sustained winds within the depression reached 40 mph (65 km/h), indicating that it had intensified into a tropical storm. At this time, the NHC assigned the name Luis to the system. Gradual strengthening took place throughout August 29 as Luis tracked towards the west-northwest. Increased wind shear displaced convection from the center of circulation, preventing further intensification.

By August 30, strong outflow developed around Luis despite convection remaining displaced from the low pressure center. Once the shear began to relent, shower and thunderstorm activity redeveloped around the center, allowing the storm to intensify. Around 1800 UTC that day, Luis attained Category 1 hurricane status on the Saffir–Simpson hurricane scale; however, operationally Luis was not upgraded to a hurricane until 0900 UTC on August 31. The newly upgraded hurricane steadily intensified as banding features developed around the periphery of the cyclone. By the morning of August 31, cold cloud tops surrounded a developing eye. Around this time, Luis was located due south of the area of high pressure and tracking steadily towards the west-northwest. Further development resulted in the appearance of a ragged eye appearing on visible satellite images. Winds within the eyewall were estimated at 100 mph (160 km/h), making Luis a low-end Category 2 hurricane. Later that day, the storm became increasingly organized, with a symmetrical structure and a well-defined center. The NHC forecast the hurricane to peak as a Category 3 hurricane in 36 hours before interacting with Hurricane Iris and Tropical Storm Karen.

== Peak intensity and the Leeward Islands ==
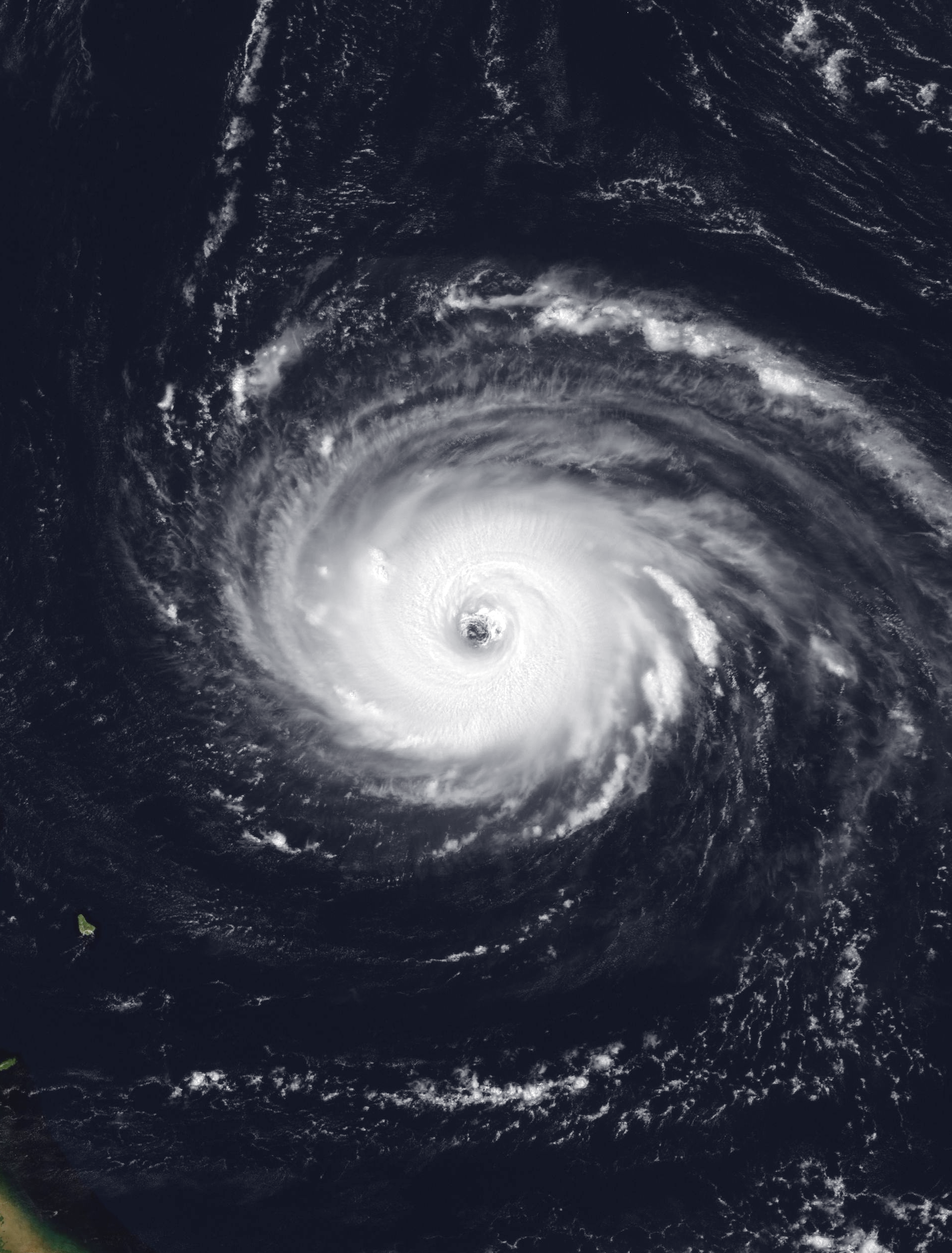
Hurricane Luis on September 3 with winds of 140 mph (225 km/h)

Early on September 1, Hurricane Luis strengthened into a Category 3 hurricane with winds of 115 mph (185 km/h); upper-level outflow continued to improve throughout the day, allowing further intensification. Maintaining its structure, Luis further intensified to a Category 4 hurricane with winds of 135 mph (215 km/h). Subsequent to doing so, its intensity remained steady for 42 hours while it tracked nearly due west. Early on September 3, satellite intensity estimates indicated that the storm strengthened slightly, attaining its peak winds of 150 mph (240 km/h) at around 0600 UTC. Continuing on a westward track, the forward motion of the hurricane decreased to 13 mph (20 km/h) later on September 3. When Luis was about 690 mi (1,110 km) east of the Lesser Antilles, a Hurricane Hunter reconnaissance flight into the storm confirmed satellite intensity estimates. Flight level winds around the eye of Luis were recorded at 165 mph (265 km/h), which corresponds to surface winds of 140 mph (225 km/h) and a minimum barometric pressure of 944 mbar (27.87 inHg).

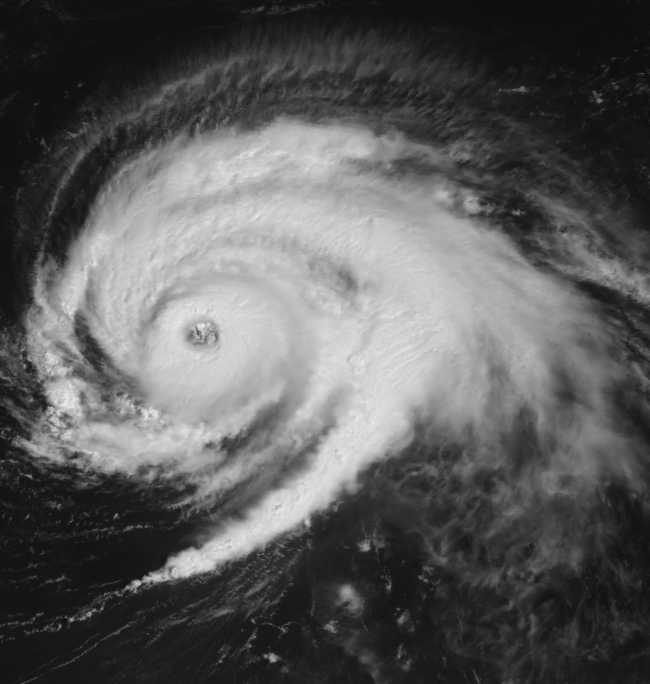
Hurricane Luis on September 6 to the north of the Leeward Islands

With a Category 4 hurricane forecast to track directly over the Leeward Islands, hurricane warnings were issued for several islands by September 4. The ridge located north of Luis began to weaken by this time, leading to slower forward movement to 12 mph (19 km/h). Outflow to the north of the hurricane weakened slightly as a distinct area of dry air developed around the weakening ridge. Late on September 4, the hurricane's eye began to shrink, a possible indication of strengthening. An area of low pressure over Florida cut off from a trough would eventually cause Luis to slow significantly and cause a northward turn. On September 5, Hurricane Luis weakened slightly, with winds decreasing to 135 mph (215 km/h), before tracking directly over Barbuda. The eyewall of the storm brushed Antigua, Saint Barthélemy, St. Martin and Anguilla. Sustained winds on these islands were recorded up to 80 mph (130 km/h) with gusts up to 155 mph (250 km/h). The eye of Luis was estimated to be 46 mi (74 km) in diameter at this time. Operationally, the NHC briefly downgraded Luis to a Category 3 hurricane as it passed through the islands due to the formation of concentric eyewalls; however, in post-season analysis, it was determined that the storm never weakened below Category 4 status while passing through the Leeward Islands.

== Bermuda and dissipation ==
Tracking away from the Leeward Islands on September 6, Luis maintained Category 4 status for another 24 hours before downgrading to a Category 3 hurricane. A strong mid- to upper-level low located over the Gulf of Mexico was forecast to steer the hurricane in a general northeastern direction. From September 6 to 7, a ship named the Teal Arrow sailed directly into the center, encountering wind gusts of up to 145 mph (235 km/h) and seas to 50 feet (15 m). The storm's eye further shrank to a diameter of 23 mi (37 km). The NHC anticipated re-strengthening as the central pressure decreased. The winds failed to intensity; however, the central pressure continued to decrease until 0000 UTC on September 8, when it fell to 935 mbar (27.6 inHg), the lowest recorded during the storm's existence. Tracking around the periphery of the ridge of high pressure, Luis began to slow. Late on September 7, a double eye featured developed, indicating an eyewall replacement cycle, with the strongest winds being recorded in the outer eyewall. By the afternoon of September 8, the eye became cloud filled, indicating weakening; however, the inner eyewall dissipated later that day, leaving a large, 52 mi (84 km) wide eye in its place. Tracking towards the north-northwest, Luis was forecast to move over an area of cooler waters upwelled by Hurricane Felix.

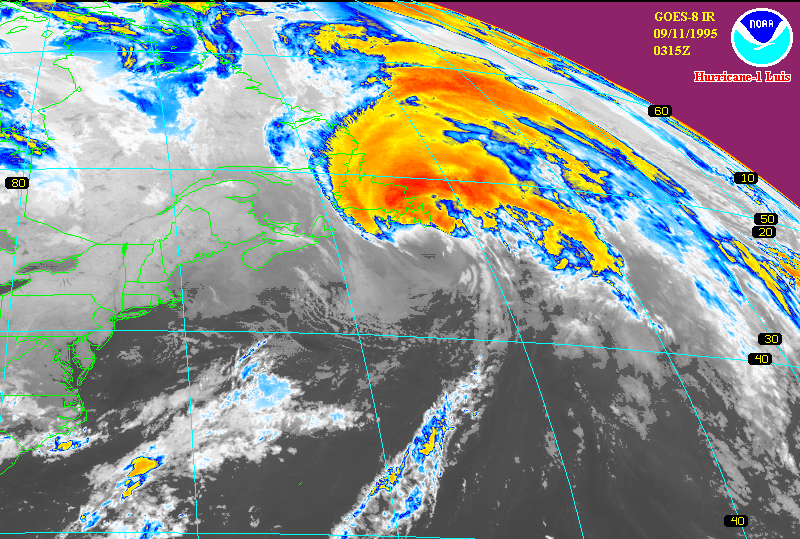
Hurricane Luis making landfall in eastern Newfoundland on September 11

Early on September 9, Luis turned towards the north and weakened to a Category 2 hurricane, with winds of 110 mph (175 km/h). Several hours later, the hurricane made its closest approach to Bermuda, passing about 200 mi (320 km) west of the island. Later that day, the storm began to accelerate as it traveled northeast ahead of a strong trough located to the northwest of Luis. During the afternoon of September 10, Hurricane Luis began to undergo an extratropical transition as it rapidly approached the Canadian coastline. Due to the rapid movement of the storm, significant weakening did not occur until Luis was at an unusually high latitude.

During the afternoon of September 10, the central pressure of the storm decreased to 961 mbar (28.4 inHg) but sustained winds did not exceed 90 mph (145 km/h) according to the NHC. Luis maintained this intensity until it made landfall on the Avalon Peninsula in eastern Newfoundland early on September 11. While tracking over Newfoundland, cold, dry air became entrenched in Luis's circulation and the system began to merge with the approaching trough. The NHC issued their final advisory on Hurricane Luis at 0900 UTC on September 11 as it tracked nearly 65 mph (105 km/h) to the northeast and transitioned into an extratropical cyclone. The extratropical remnants persisted for 30 more hours over the North Atlantic Ocean before being absorbed by the trough near the southern coast of Greenland late on September 12.

== Records ==
When Tropical Depression Thirteen strengthened into Tropical Storm Luis on August 29, it marked the second earliest date on which the twelfth named storm of any season formed, before being surpassed by Hurricane Laura which formed on August 21, 2020. Shortly before becoming extratropical, Hurricane Luis was moving at 65 mph (105 km/h), becoming among the fastest Atlantic hurricanes in recorded history. On September 11, a 30 metres (98 ft) wave struck an ocean liner. This wave is the largest ever recorded, though Hurricane Ivan in 2004 may have produced a wave up to 40 metres (130 ft) high off the coast of Mexico.

== See also ==
- Hurricane Luis
- 1995 Atlantic hurricane season
