= Ingrid =

Ingrid may refer to:

- Ingrid (given name), including a list of people and fictional characters
- Ingrid Burley (born 1986), rapper known mononymously as Ingrid
- Ingrid (record label), also an artist collective
- Tropical Storm Ingrid, various cyclones
- 1026 Ingrid, an asteroid
- InGrid, the grid computing project within D-Grid

== See also ==
- In-Grid
- Ingrid Marie apple cultivar
