= List of storms named Iris =

The name Iris was used for sixteen tropical cyclones worldwide. Three in the Atlantic Ocean, ten in the West Pacific, one in the South-West Indian Ocean, and two in the Southwest Pacific Ocean. It has also been used once in Europe.

In the Atlantic:

- Tropical Storm Iris (1989) – did not become strong or threaten land due to interaction with Hurricane Hugo, but dropped heavy rain on areas already drenched by Hugo.
- Hurricane Iris (1995) – moved up the Leeward Islands, causing four deaths on Martinique, later reached Europe as a strong extratropical storm.
- Hurricane Iris (2001) – struck Belize as a Category 4 storm, killing several in Central America, including 20 on a ship that capsized off the coast. Caused $66 million in damage to Belize.

The name Iris was retired after the 2001 season, and was replaced by Ingrid in the 2007 season.

In the Western Pacific:

- Typhoon Iris (1951) (T5104) – Category 5
- Typhoon Iris (1955) (T5519) – Category 1
- Typhoon Iris (1959) (T5908, 18W) – Category 2 which struck China.
- Tropical Storm Iris (1962) (T6204, 22W)
- Typhoon Iris (1964) (T6428, 43W) – Category 1 which struck Vietnam.
- Tropical Storm Iris (1967) (T6716, 18W, Oniang)
- Typhoon Iris (1970) (T7018, 19W) – Category 3
- Typhoon Iris (1973) (T7310, 10W) – Category 2
- Typhoon Iris (1976) (T7620, 20W) – Category 1
- Tropical Storm Iris (1999) (02W, Bebeng, Japan Meteorological Agency analyzed it as a tropical depression, not as a tropical storm.)

In the Southwest Indian Ocean:

- Cyclone Iris (1965)

In the South Pacific:

- Cyclone Iris (2000)
- Cyclone Iris (2018)

In Europe:

- Storm Isha – Named Iris by the Free University of Berlin (FUB).
