= List of storms named Ingrid =

The name Ingrid has been used for eight tropical cyclones worldwide: two in the Atlantic Ocean, one in the West Pacific Ocean, two in the South-West Indian Ocean, and three in the Australian region. Ingrid has also been used for one European windstorm.

In the Atlantic, where Ingrid replaced Iris:

- Tropical Storm Ingrid (2007) – a short-lived tropical storm that dissipated before reaching the Lesser Antilles.
- Hurricane Ingrid (2013) – one of two tropical cyclones, along with Hurricane Manuel, to strike Mexico within a 24-hour period; one of the only two hurricanes in the season.

After the 2013 season, the name Ingrid was retired and replaced by Imelda.

In the West Pacific:

- Typhoon Ingrid (1946) – struck the Philippines and China.

In the South-West Indian:

- Tropical Cyclone Ingrid (1964)
- Cyclone Ingrid (1995)

In the Australian region:

- Cyclone Ingrid (1970)
- Cyclone Ingrid (1984)
- Cyclone Ingrid (2005) – caused 5 deaths in Queensland and Northern Territory.

In Europe:

- Storm Ingrid (2026)
