= Hurricane Iris (1995) =

Category 2 Atlantic hurricane

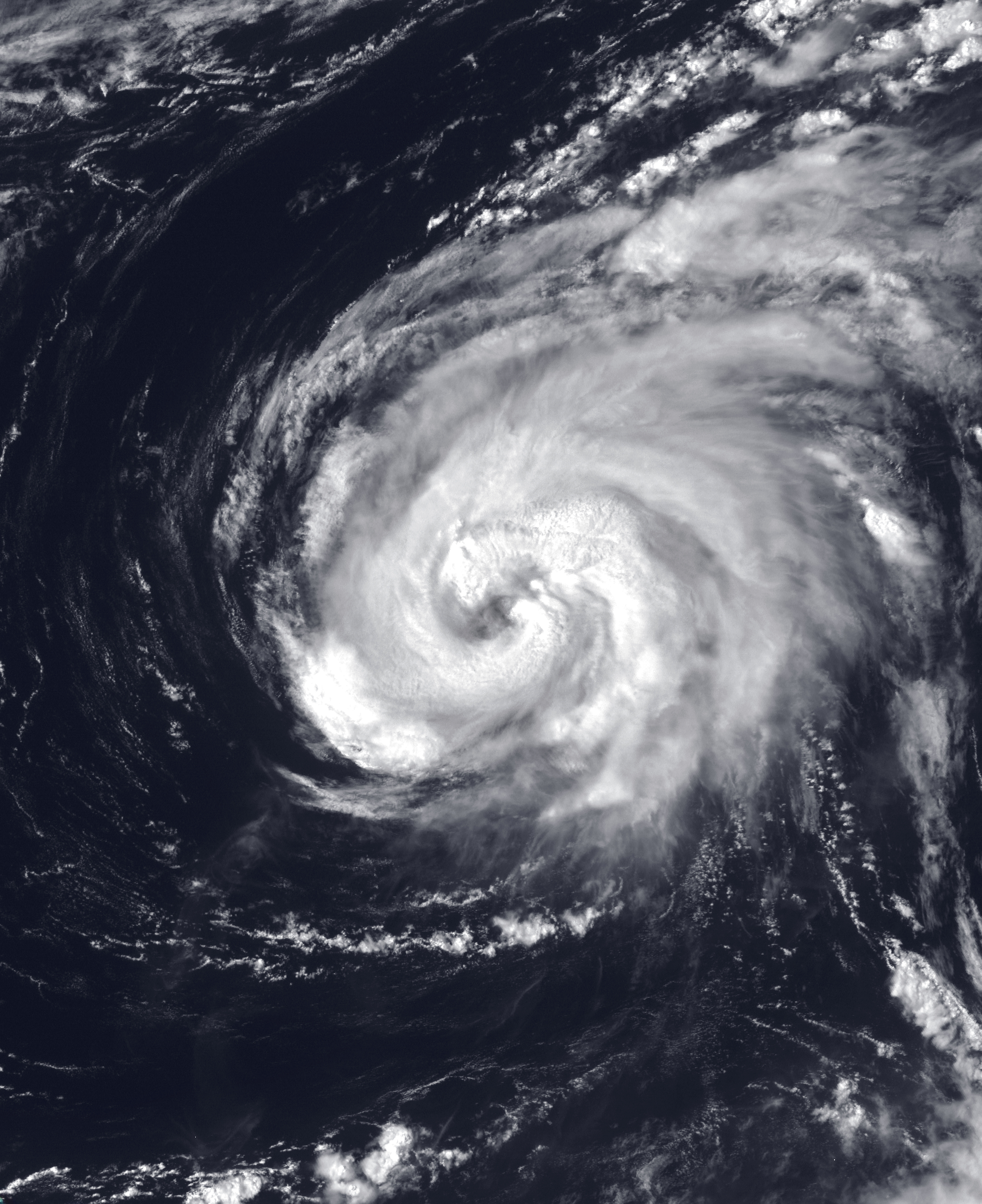
- Iris near peak intensity, well to the northeast of the Lesser Antilles, on August 31

Meteorological history
- Formed: August 22, 1995
- Extratropical: September 4, 1995
- Dissipated: September 7, 1995

Category 2 hurricane
- 1-minute sustained (SSHWS/NWS)
- Highest winds: 110 mph (175 km/h)
- Lowest pressure: 965 mbar (hPa); 28.50 inHg

Overall effects
- Fatalities: 5 direct
- Damage: Unknown
- Areas affected: Leeward Islands, Western Europe
- IBTrACS
- Part of the 1995 Atlantic hurricane season

Hurricane Iris was the first of three tropical cyclones to affect the Lesser Antilles in a three-week period, preceding the more destructive hurricanes Luis and Marilyn. The ninth named storm and fifth hurricane of the 1995 Atlantic hurricane season, Iris developed from a tropical wave to the east of the Lesser Antilles on August 22 and attained hurricane status within 30 hours. The hurricane weakened to a tropical storm before crossing the islands of the eastern Caribbean from August 26 through August 28. During that time, Iris became one of four active tropical storms in the Atlantic basin. Earlier it had interacted with Hurricane Humberto, and beginning on August 30, Iris interacted with Tropical Storm Karen. Iris re-intensified into a hurricane and attained peak sustained winds of 110 mph (175 km/h) while moving slowly across the central Atlantic. The hurricane accelerated to the north and absorbed a dissipating Karen on September 3. Iris weakened to a tropical storm and became extratropical on September 4, though its remnants re-attained hurricane-force winds, before affecting western Europe on September 7. The storm dissipated soon afterward.

As a tropical storm, Iris produced heavy rainfall across much of the Leeward Islands. In the southern Lesser Antilles, high waves caused coastal flooding in Trinidad, while in Martinique further north, significant amounts of precipitation led to flooding and landslides. The threat from the hurricane halted airplane evacuations on Montserrat, which was being threatened by the eruption of the Soufrière Hills volcano. There were five deaths in association with Iris—four in Martinique, and one in Guadeloupe.

== Meteorological history ==
Map plotting the storm's track and intensity, according to the Saffir–Simpson scale Map key Saffir–Simpson scale Tropical depression (≤38 mph, ≤62 km/h) Tropical storm (39–73 mph, 63–118 km/h) Category 1 (74–95 mph, 119–153 km/h) Category 2 (96–110 mph, 154–177 km/h) Category 3 (111–129 mph, 178–208 km/h) Category 4 (130–156 mph, 209–251 km/h) Category 5 (≥157 mph, ≥252 km/h) Unknown Storm type Tropical cyclone Subtropical cyclone Extratropical cyclone, remnant low, tropical disturbance, or monsoon depression

A tropical wave exited western Africa on August 16, with a circulation emerging just south of Dakar, Senegal. It was the first of four consecutive waves that would later develop into tropical cyclones. As the system moved westward, thunderstorms diminished on August 18, before they gradually redeveloped. At around 1200 UTC, the National Hurricane Center (NHC) classified the system as Tropical Depression Ten about 690 mi (1,110 km) east of the Lesser Antilles. Around that time, the depression had a well-organized area of convection and evident circulation, as confirmed by a nearby ship. Within six hours of developing, the depression had intensified into a tropical storm. Initially, tropical cyclone forecast models had difficulty predicting the future of the storm, due to uncertain interaction between it and Tropical Storm Humberto to its northeast. In real-time, the NHC upgraded the depression to Tropical Storm Iris at 1500 UTC on August 23, or about 21 hours later than assessed in post-analysis. The intensity was based on satellite intensity estimates. At that time, the storm had a ragged central dense overcast—a uniformly circular area of thunderstorms—as well as rainbands to the north and south. A hurricane hunters flight late on August 23 indicated that Iris was significantly stronger, reporting 10–second sustained winds of 106 mph (171 km/h) at flight-level. Based on the reading, it is estimated Iris attained hurricane status around 1800 UTC that day, or about three hours after it was named.

After Iris strengthened into a hurricane, it turned to the west-southwest due to interaction with Hurricane Humberto. An upper-level low north of Puerto Rico increased wind shear over the hurricane, which dislocated the center from the deep convection. As a result, Iris weakened to tropical storm status on August 24 after being a hurricane for about 24 hours. As the storm approached the Lesser Antilles, the thunderstorms decreased markedly and the cloud pattern became disorganized. As late as August 25, there was uncertainty whether Iris would continue toward the islands or turn to the north. A new circulation became the dominant center as the storm continued westward, and Iris brushed Saint Lucia early on August 26. An approaching trough turned the storm to the northwest, bringing it near most of the Lesser Antilles. Early on August 27, Iris weakened to an intensity of 40 mph (64 km/h), although it immediately began restrengthening. Later that day, the center made landfall on Montserrat, Anguilla, and Barbuda with winds of over 60 mph (95 km/h). By that time, an eye began reforming, and the structure became better organized as wind shear decreased.

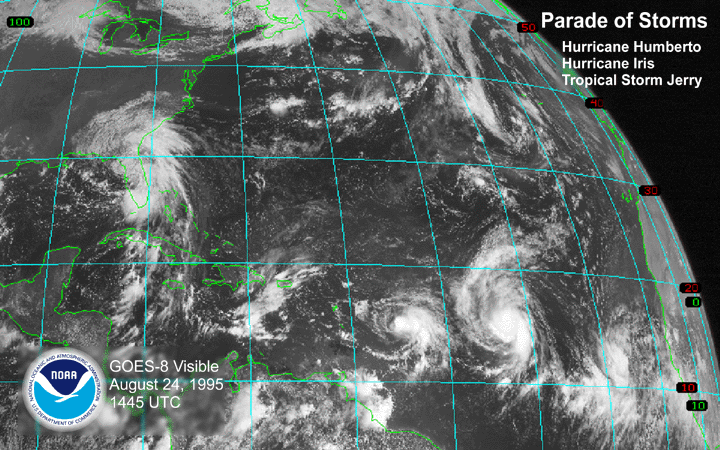
A satellite image of the Atlantic Ocean on August 24 including Humberto, Iris, Jerry, and two waves that would ultimately become Karen and Luis

On August 28, Iris moved away from the Lesser Antilles, and at 1800 UTC re-attained hurricane status as it began a steady motion to the north-northwest. By that time, there was uncertainty in its future track due to the possible interactions among Iris, Humberto to the northeast, Tropical Storm Karen to the southeast, and the remnants of Tropical Storm Jerry to the west. In addition, after Tropical Storm Luis formed on August 27, there were four active tropical cyclones in the Atlantic. A few days later, there were three simultaneous hurricanes, which is a rare event, when Luis attained hurricane status. On August 30, Iris turned to the northeast while it began interacting directly with Tropical Storm Karen. Over the next few days, the smaller tropical storm moved around the larger circulation of Iris, potentially causing the hurricane to move erratically. Iris's intensity did not change significantly during that time, and it maintained strong outflow but a weak eyewall. An eastward-moving trough bypassed the storm to the north, causing the motion to become nearly stationary. A building ridge to the northeast caused Iris to turn to a northwest drift on September 1. By that time, the eye had become distinct and well-organized, and at 0600 UTC that day, Iris attained peak winds of 110 mph (175 km/h) to the southeast of Bermuda.

After reaching peak intensity, the hurricane began weakening due to increasing shear and cooler waters. An approaching trough turned Iris to the north, and early on September 3, the hurricane passed about 350 mi (565 km) east of Bermuda. That day, Iris absorbed the dissipating Tropical Depression Karen. It accelerated to the northeast as it lost tropical characteristics, and after weakening to a tropical storm, Iris transitioned into an extratropical cyclone on September 4 to the southeast of Newfoundland. The remnants of Iris turned to the east, moving in tandem with an extratropical storm to its north. On September 5, the barometric pressure dropped by more than 24 millibars (0.71 inHg), which qualified as being classified as a meteorological bomb. The next day, the winds strengthened to hurricane-status, and the storm maintained a track to the east due to a ridge weakening to the north. The pressure reached a minimum of 957 mbar (28.3 inHg) early on September 7, lower than when Iris was tropical. That day, the storm weakened as it entered the English Channel, and the extratropical remnants continued across western Europe.

== Preparations and impact ==
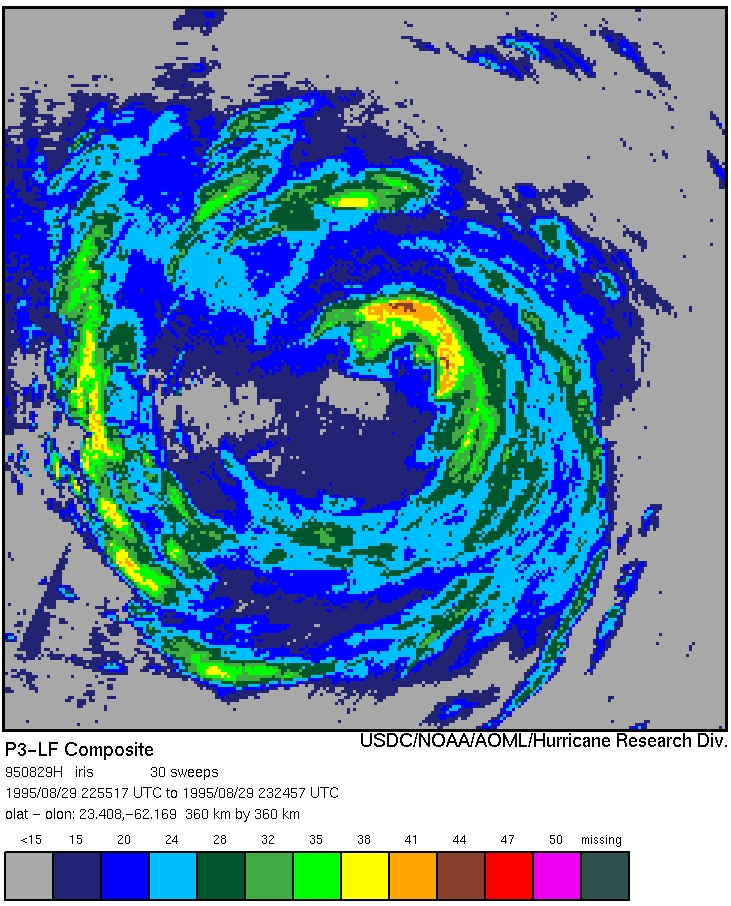
Weather radar image of Hurricane Iris on August 29

Before Iris moved through the Lesser Antilles, tropical storm watches, and later warnings, were issued from Barbados through the British Virgin Islands. The storm produced tropical storm force winds across the eastern Caribbean, although the primary meteorological event occurred from heavy rainfall. Flooding prompted evacuations in communities in Saint Lucia, Dominica, and Saint Vincent and the Grenadines. Iris was the first of three storms in a three-week period to affect the region, preceding the more destructive hurricanes Luis and Marilyn.

In western Trinidad, a feeder produced winds of 37 mph (60 km/h) along the Gulf of Paria. The winds increased waves that caused coastal flooding and some damage to boats. On Martinique, Iris produced gusts of 56 mph (90 km/h), with torrential rainfall occurring on the island. A station in Les Trois-Îlets recorded 1.89 in (48 mm) in a 30-minute period, and the highest total on the island was 17.72 in (450 mm) at Ducos. The rains caused mudslides that killed four people, including two after a house was swept off a cliff in Le Vauclin. Flooding was reported across coastal areas of Martinique, and heavy damage was reported in the southern city of Le Vauclin. To the north of Martinique, winds reached 43 mph (69 km/h) on Dominica. While the storm passed Guadeloupe, it produced sustained winds of 45 mph (72 km/h), with gusts to 65 mph (105 km/h) on La Désirade. There was one death on the island after a person drowned in a storm-flooded river. To the northwest, the hurricane moved over Montserrat, causing additional problems on the island just weeks after the Soufrière Hills volcano began erupting. Officials on the island closed the primary airport due to the storm, which prevented residents from evacuating from the island from the volcano threat. Further north, Iris dropped 6 in (150 mm) of rain on Antigua, which destroyed banana trees and caused flooding in low-lying areas.

Due to uncertainties in Iris's track, the government of Bermuda issued a tropical storm watch on September 1. This was downgraded on September 3 after the hurricane bypassed the island. Later, after Iris became extratropical, the storm produced winds of 45 mph (72 km/h) at La Rochelle on the Atlantic coast of France.

== See also ==
- Other storms named Iris
- Timeline of the 1995 Atlantic hurricane season
