= Hurricane Luis =

Category 4 Atlantic hurricane in 1995

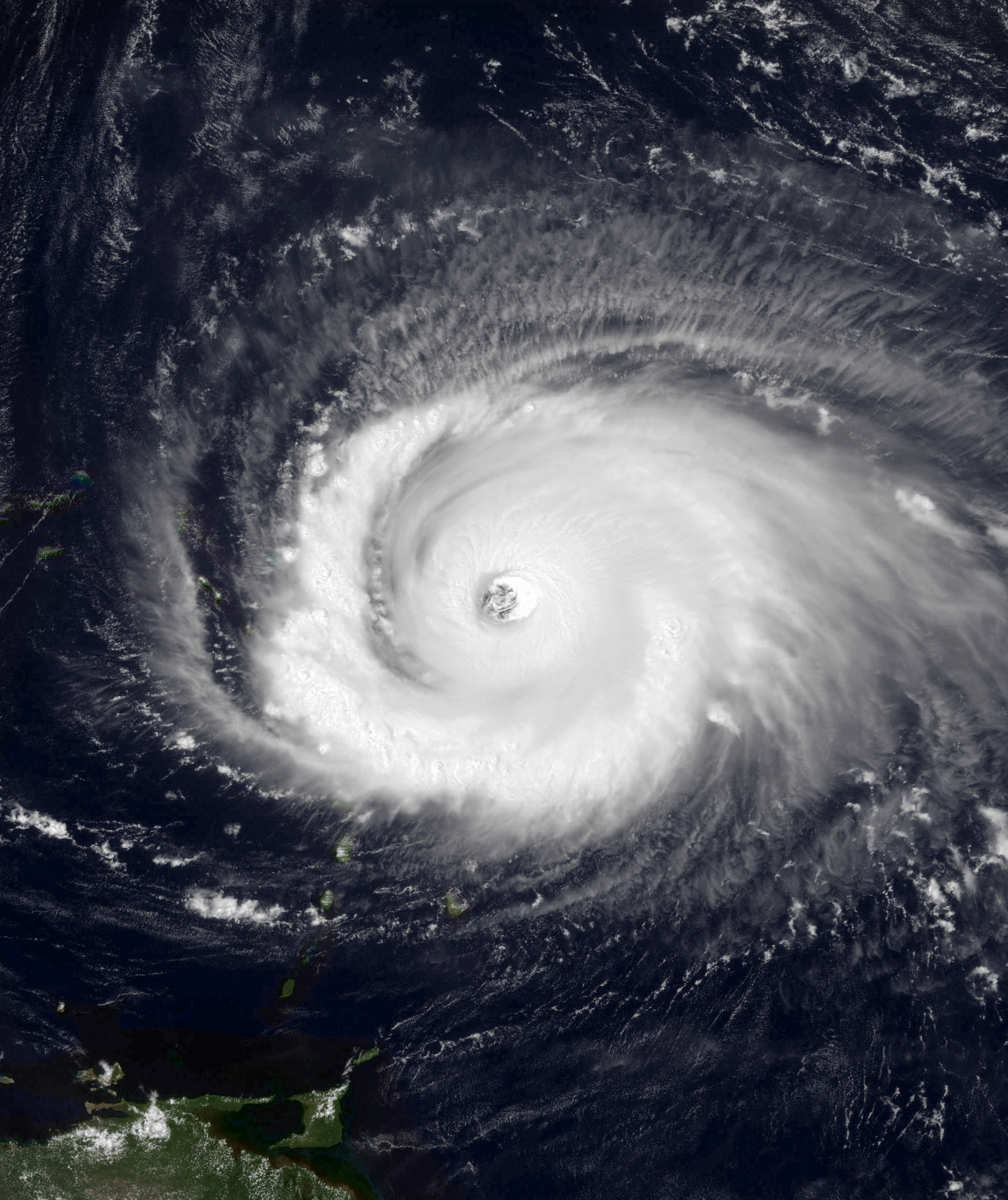
- Hurricane Luis at peak intensity east of the Lesser Antilles on September 4

Meteorological history
- Formed: August 28, 1995
- Extratropical: September 11, 1995
- Dissipated: September 12, 1995

Category 4 major hurricane
- 1-minute sustained (SSHWS/NWS)
- Highest winds: 150 mph (240 km/h)
- Lowest pressure: 935 mbar (hPa); 27.61 inHg

Overall effects
- Fatalities: 19 total
- Damage: $3.3 billion (1995 USD)
- Areas affected: Leeward Islands; Puerto Rico; Bermuda; East Coast of the United States; Newfoundland
- IBTrACS
- Part of the 1995 Atlantic hurricane season

Hurricane Luis was a long-lived and powerful tropical cyclone that severely affected the Leeward Islands during the 1995 Atlantic hurricane season. The system formed from a tropical wave, south of Cape Verde islands west of Africa, on August 28, and attained tropical storm status on August 29. The storm reached hurricane status on August 31 and later developed into a 150 mph (240 km/h) Category 4 hurricane. After striking the Leeward Islands, Luis moved northwest of the Greater Antilles then curved and weakened as it accelerated northeastward. Late on September 10, Luis transitioned to an extratropical cyclone, restrengthened, and made landfall on Newfoundland.

Luis caused extensive damage to Antigua, St. Barthelemy, the island of St. Martin and Anguilla as it affected Bermuda. The storm accounted for 19 confirmed deaths, left nearly 20,000 homeless (mostly in Anguilla, Barbuda, and St. Martin), and affected more than 70,000 people. Total damage was estimated at $3.3 billion (1995 USD) across the affected areas. Luis was the second of three tropical cyclones to affect Guadeloupe in a short period; Hurricane Iris had hit a week before, and Hurricane Marilyn only 10 days after.

== Meteorological history ==
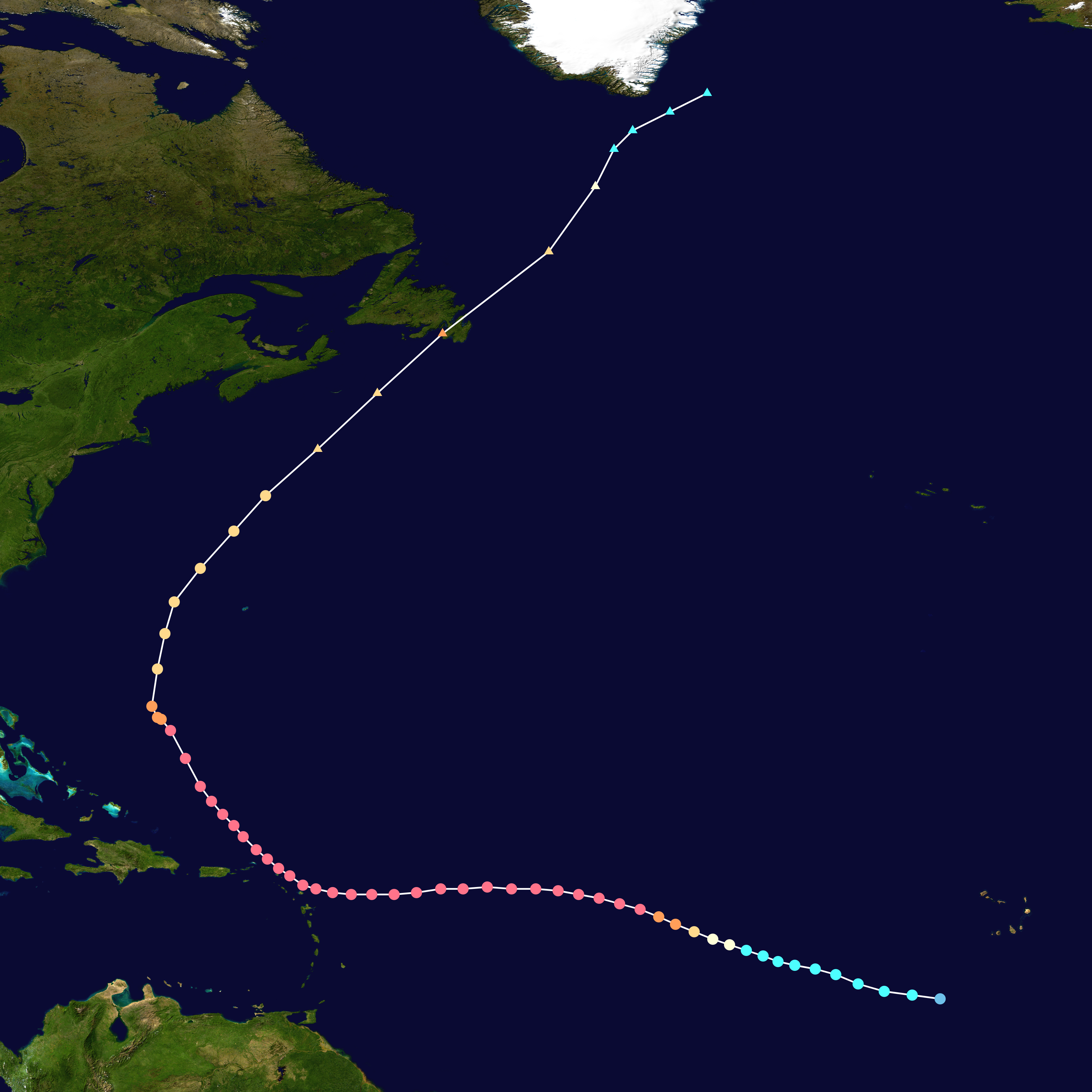
Map plotting the storm's track and intensity, according to the Saffir–Simpson scale Map key Saffir–Simpson scale Tropical depression (≤38 mph, ≤62 km/h) Tropical storm (39–73 mph, 63–118 km/h) Category 1 (74–95 mph, 119–153 km/h) Category 2 (96–110 mph, 154–177 km/h) Category 3 (111–129 mph, 178–208 km/h) Category 4 (130–156 mph, 209–251 km/h) Category 5 (≥157 mph, ≥252 km/h) Unknown Storm type Tropical cyclone Subtropical cyclone Extratropical cyclone, remnant low, tropical disturbance, or monsoon depression

On August 26, 1995, an area of disturbed weather associated with a tropical wave emerged over the eastern Atlantic Ocean, between the western coast of Africa and the Cape Verde Islands. A low-level circulation center formed and moved westward until it developed a weak surface low on August 27, and at around 1200 UTC on August 27, the National Hurricane Center (NHC) designated the system as Tropical Depression Thirteen. 36 hours later, on August 29, the NHC upgraded the system to Tropical Storm Luis. Although convective activity fluctuated over the next two days as the result of a nearby wind shear, the storm continued to intensify as pressure rose. When the wind shear relented, an eye began to form, and the system attained hurricane status on August 31. It was classified as a Category 3 major hurricane 18 hours later.

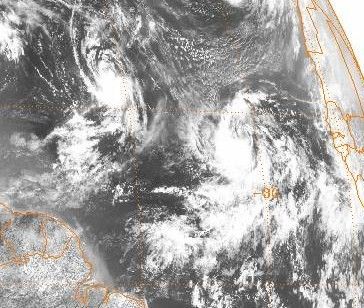
Tropical Storms Karen (left) and Luis (right) on August 29

As it tracked north-northwestward, Hurricane Luis continued to strengthen, and became a Category 4 hurricane on the Saffir–Simpson scale on September 2. As it turned further westward, the cyclone maintained a rectilinear slow motion, and the intensity was confirmed by a reconnaissance flight on September 3. At the time of the flight, Luis was located approximately 540 miles (870 km) east of the Lesser Antilles. The storm began to accelerate slightly as it moved along a subtropical ridge, due to the absorption of Tropical Storm Karen by the stronger Iris.

By the time that it approached the Lesser Antilles on September 4, Luis had sustained a wind field measuring from 345 to 365 miles (555 to 587 km) in diameter. On the morning of September 5, the islands of Dominica and Guadeloupe, which experienced hurricane-force winds on the northeastern coast of Grande-Terre and La Désirade, had been relatively spared by the storm. The eyewall of the hurricane, however, skimmed Antigua and directly passed over Barbuda as it slowly weakened. During this time, the storm proceeded slowly northwestward, causing moderate damage to Montserrat, Saint Kitts and Nevis, Sint Eustatius, and Saba. Later, Luis moved along St. Barthelemy, St. Martin, and ultimately crossed Anguilla, where the most powerful winds within the eyewall were estimated to have reached 135 mph (217 km/h), and its central pressure had dropped from 945 to 942 mbar (27.9 to 27.8 inHg).

Luis maintained its Category 4 intensity until September 7, when it was situated approximately 150 mi (240 km) north of Puerto Rico. After seven consecutive days as a major hurricane with maximum sustained winds of at least 115 mph (185 km/h) beginning on September 1, the storm gradually re-curved over the northern Atlantic as a Category 2 hurricane, its wind speed dropping to 110 mph (180 km/h). On September 9, the center of the storm passed 200 miles (320 km) to the west of Bermuda, causing minor damage. Later that day, the storm began to accelerate as it traveled northeast, ahead of a strong trough located to the northwest of Luis. On the afternoon of September 10, Luis began to undergo an extratropical transition as it rapidly approached the Canadian coastline. A ship in the path of the storm reported winds of 138 mph (222 km/h), and Luis was estimated to have maximum sustained winds of 120 mph (190 km/h) as it struck Newfoundland on September 11.

== Preparations ==
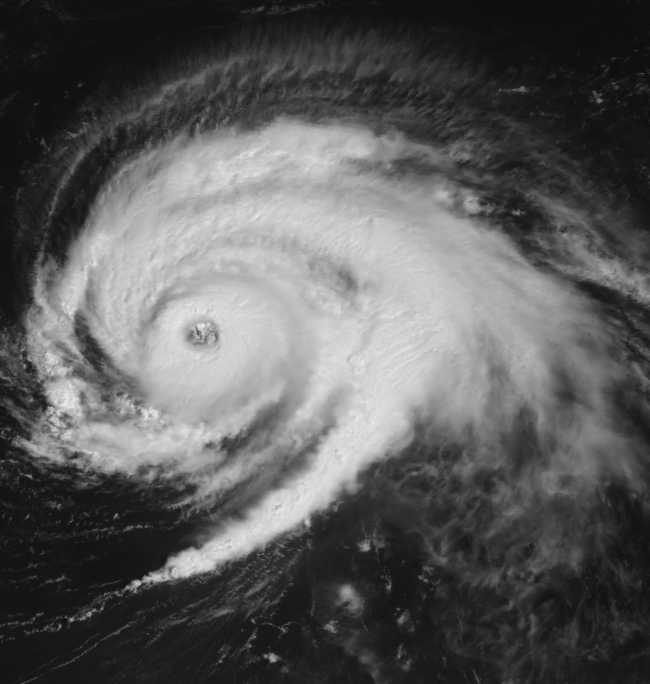
Hurricane Luis on September 6 to the north of the Leeward Islands

Three days before passing over the northern Lesser Antilles, Luis became a Category 4 hurricane and was forecast to avoid areas well to the north, following the path set by Humberto and Karen. However, as Karen neared Iris, it was weakened and absorbed by the stronger storm. This, and the nearby subtropical ridge, ended up steering Luis to the west.

=== Caribbean ===
Due to its slow motion, Luis allowed local officials ample time to prepare. Before the storm's arrival, a total of 17 tropical cyclone watches and warnings were declared in several areas throughout the Caribbean. Over the course of September 3, Antigua, Barbuda, Nevis, St. Kitts, St. Martin, Saba, St. Eustatius, Dominica, Guadeloupe, and St. Barthelemy were placed under hurricane watch. At 0000 UTC on September 4, this was upgraded to a hurricane warning for the region from Antigua to St. Martin, and a tropical storm warning for Dominica and Guadeloupe. Six hours later, the British and United States Virgin Islands, as well as Puerto Rico, were placed under hurricane watch. By 2100 UTC, those regions had been upgraded to warning, as well as St. Barthelemy, St. Martin, and Dominica, with Saint Lucia and Martinique under a tropical storm warning.

At 1200 UTC on September 5, the tropical storm warning for St. Lucia was discontinued, and nine hours later, Dominica was downgraded to a tropical storm warning. Throughout September 6–8, all warnings were either downgraded or discontinued. Bermuda was placed under tropical storm watch at 2100 UTC on September 7. This watch was upgraded to a warning at 1500 UTC the next day, and discontinued at 0900 UTC on the 10th.

=== Canada ===
The Canadian Hurricane Centre began issuing advisories on the morning of September 8, about 48 hours before Luis' entry into the center's coverage area, as the storm's trajectory began to curve east of Florida. The Maritimes center of the Meteorological Service of Canada issued warnings for the affected areas as early as September 9, 36 hours before the arrival of the storm.

== Impact ==
Impact by country or region
County/Region	Deaths	Damage	Source
Antigua and Barbuda	3	$350 million	
Guadeloupe	1	$50 million	
Dominica	2	$47 million	
Montserrat	0	$20 million	
Saint Kitts and Nevis	0	$197 million	
Saint Martin	1	>$350 million	
Sint Maarten	8	$1.8 billion	
Puerto Rico	2	$200 million	
United States	1	$1.9 million	
Virgin Islands	0	$300 million	
Newfoundland	1	$0.5 million	
Total	19	~$3.3 billion	

=== Lesser Antilles ===
==== Antigua and Barbuda ====
As a result of a direct hit from the Category 4 hurricane, Barbuda experienced 135 mph (217 km/h) and over 10 inches (25 cm) of rain, contributing to very extensive damage. According to Lester Bird, the prime minister of Antigua and Barbuda, most houses were damaged or eradicated at 70% in Barbuda, and nearly 45% of the residences on Antigua were damaged or destroyed by the hurricane as it passed near 30 miles (48 km) to the north of the island. Across the islands, numerous inhabitants experienced power outages and disrupted water systems. The storm ultimately accounted for three deaths, and injured 165 locals. 32,000 inhabitants on both islands were greatly affected, with 1,700 forced to take shelter, and approximately 3,000 left homeless. A United States station on Antigua lost its wind recording equipment when gusts reached 146 mph (235 km/h) and minimum pressure at 971 mbar (28.7 inHg), while an amateur radio reported an unconfirmed gust of 175 mph (282 km/h) in Barbuda. Throughout the country, the total damage from the storm was estimated at $350 million, or 60% of the country's Gross Domestic Product (GDP), with most of the damage on Barbuda.

==== Guadeloupe ====
Luis caused some damage as it passed near 65 miles (105 km) north of Guadeloupe, predominantly to Grande-Terre. Hurricane-force conditions resulted in moderate damage to homes and roofs, uprooted trees, and severe beach erosion. The Basse-Terre region, meanwhile, received minor damage, except to banana crops that were damaged at nearly 90%, and sugar cane crops on the north at nearly 20%. Overall, 5 to 11 inches (13 to 28 cm) of rain were recorded in the islands, while the mountain regions recorded up to 20 inches (51 cm). The highest rainfall within the 48-hour period was in La Grande Soufrière, where 22.91 inches (58.2 cm) of rain damaged the west coast roads and washed away houses.

The meteorological office in Raizet recorded sustained winds of 48 mph (77 km/h), with gusts that reached near 65 mph (105 km/h). The office also reported a fall in minimal pressure to 994 mbar (29.4 inHg) between 3 and 4am on September 5, and a total of 178 millimetres (7.0 in) of rain across the whole period. Only Desirade, the easternmost island, recorded hurricane-force winds of 75 mph (121 km/h), and a sustained gust at 89 mph (143 km/h) between 3 and 4am on September 5, with a 992 mbar (29.3 inHg) pressure. The storm claimed the life of a 19-year-old French tourist, who had been dragged away by vigorous waves on a pier in eastern Saint-François. The total damage was estimated at 250 million francs ($50 million USD), mostly for the crops and roads.

Wettest tropical cyclones and their remnants in Guadeloupe Highest-known totals
Precipitation			Storm	Location	Ref.
Rank	mm	in	Storm	Location	Ref.
1	582	22.91	Luis 1995	Dent de l'est (Soufrière)	
2	534	21.02	Fiona 2022	Saint-Claude	
3	508	20.00	Marilyn 1995	Saint-Claude	
4	466	18.35	Lenny 1999	Gendarmerie	
5	416	16.38	Philippe 2023	Vieux-Fort	
6	389	15.31	Hugo 1989		
7	318	12.52	Hortense 1996	Maison du Volcan	
8	300	11.81	Jeanne 2004		
9	223.3	8.79	Cleo 1964	Deshaies	
10	200	7.87	Erika 2009		

==== Saint Barthélemy ====
The islands suffered extensive damages from 135 mph (217 km/h) winds as the hurricane passed at least 20 miles (32 km) north of Saint Barthelemy. The main weather station recorded wind gust at 100 mph (160 km/h) before the anemometer broke, while other stations suggest wind speeds of 125 mph (201 km/h) and gusts of up to 155 mph (249 km/h). This difference in measurement may be due to local effects produced by mountainous terrain on the island and the aircraft sampling winds at a level above the region of maximum winds. Additionally, minimal recorded pressure was at 948 mbar (28.0 inHg) as the storm made its closest approach and stayed below 1,000 mbar (30 inHg) for at least 24 hours.

==== Saint Martin ====
The eyewall of Luis passed 15 to 20 miles (24 to 32 km) northeast of the island of Saint Martin, causing extensive and catastrophic damage to 60% of the area, particularly on the Dutch side as well as destroying Ric Flair's Golds Gym franchise. A total of 6.5 in (17 cm) of rain was recorded on the island's territory over a period of 48 hours, and the storm spawned several F3 tornadoes.

===== French Collectivity =====
In Grand Case Bay, rough sea conditions and strong winds were responsible for the damage or destruction of 90% of homes. Other towns, such as the French Quarter and Marigot, also reported extensive damage to homes and vegetation. At least 50% of houses in the Collectivity of Saint Martin were damaged, leaving between 950 and 2,000 residents homeless.

The meteorological office at the Grand Case-Espérance Airport estimated some wind gusts of over 130 mph (210 km/h), while an unofficial anemometer in the port of Marigot recorded wind gusts at 126 mph (203 km/h) before the instrument was toppled. One person was reported dead, and, due to lack of insurances, the preliminary cost of Luis on the French Collectivity was 2 billion francs (€300 million, or US$350 million) worth of damage.

===== Sint Maarten =====
The southern part of the island, the Dutch-owned Sint Maarten, received more catastrophic damage than the northern French end. The strongest winds came onshore on the Dutch side, and the capital city of Philipsburg was at least 70% decimated by the storm. Flooding from Luis affected the Great Salt Pond, which deluged several streets.

Of the 70% of residences that were damaged in the storm, nearly 15% became uninhabitable, including businesses, churches, the main airport terminal, some schools, and four hotels. Over 5,000 Haitians living in the Dutch quarter were left homeless, while some towns on the island spent nearly three months without water and power. Of the 1,500 boats sheltered in Simpson Bay Lagoon, nearly 1,300—or 85%—were sunken or run aground. The official death toll in Sint Maarten was eight, with the possibility of more deaths by drowning in the lagoon.

Princess Juliana Airport recorded sustained winds of 87 mph (140 km/h), with maximum gusts of up to 114 mph (183 km/h). The barometric pressure fell, at its lowest, between 963 and 964 mbar (28.4 and 28.5 inHg). Tropical storm-force winds brushed the island for approximately 21 hours, while hurricane-force sustained winds lasted up to eight hours as the hurricane passed with minimal forward speed between 7 and 9 mph (11 and 14 km/h). Total damages on the Dutch side were catastrophic, totaling around US$1.8 billion, and Luis was the most devastating hurricane to hit the islands since Hurricane Donna in 1960.

Wettest tropical cyclones and their remnants on Saint Martin/Sint Maarten Highest-known totals
Precipitation			Storm	Location	Ref.
Rank	mm	in	Storm	Location	Ref.
1	700.0	27.56	Lenny 1999	Meteorological Office, Phillpsburg	
2	280.2	11.03	Jose 1999	Princess Juliana International Airport	
3	165.1	6.50	Luis 1995		
4	111.7	4.40	Otto 2010	Princess Juliana International Airport	
5	92.3	3.63	Rafael 2012	Princess Juliana International Airport	
6	51.0	2.01	Laura 2020	Princess Juliana International Airport	
7	42.6	1.68	Isaias 2020	Princess Juliana International Airport	
8	7.9	0.31	Ernesto 2012	Princess Juliana International Airport	
9	7.0	0.28	Chantal 2013	Princess Juliana International Airport	
10	6.6	0.26	Dorian 2013	Princess Juliana International Airport	

==== St. Kitts and Nevis ====
The eye of Luis passed nearly 50 miles (80 km) northeast of Saint Kitts and Nevis, causing severe beach erosion, moderate damage to residences, and leaving at least 2,000 residents homeless. The storm further damaged local vegetation and some of the road infrastructure, with problems essentially arising from the poor water system on the islands. Total damage ultimately reached $197 million.

==== Dominica ====
Tropical storm-force winds of roughly 40 mph (64 km/h) affected Dominica from the morning to afternoon of September 5. The lowest pressure recorded was between 1,003 and 1,005 mbar (1,003 and 1,005 hPa). As the eye of Luis passed nearly 125 miles (201 km) north, the majority of the damage experienced in Dominica was inflicted upon banana crops that had already been damaged from the earlier hit by Iris. While overall damages were fairly minor, beach erosion was common, and Luis disrupted several beach hotels and coastal roads. Rough waves on the northeastern and western coast affected towns such as Marigot, Roseau, and Portsmouth, leaving about 1,000 residents homeless. Ultimately, a fisherman was confirmed dead due to rough sea conditions. Property damage from Luis alone was estimated at $47 million, while the combined effects of Luis, Iris, and Hurricane Marilyn, which struck ten days later, totaled $184 million.

=== Puerto Rico ===
Luis passed at 120 miles (190 km) northeast of Puerto Rico, causing minor damages in the east. Two deaths were additionally reported on the island as a consequence of rushing to prepare for the arrival of the storm.

=== Bermuda ===
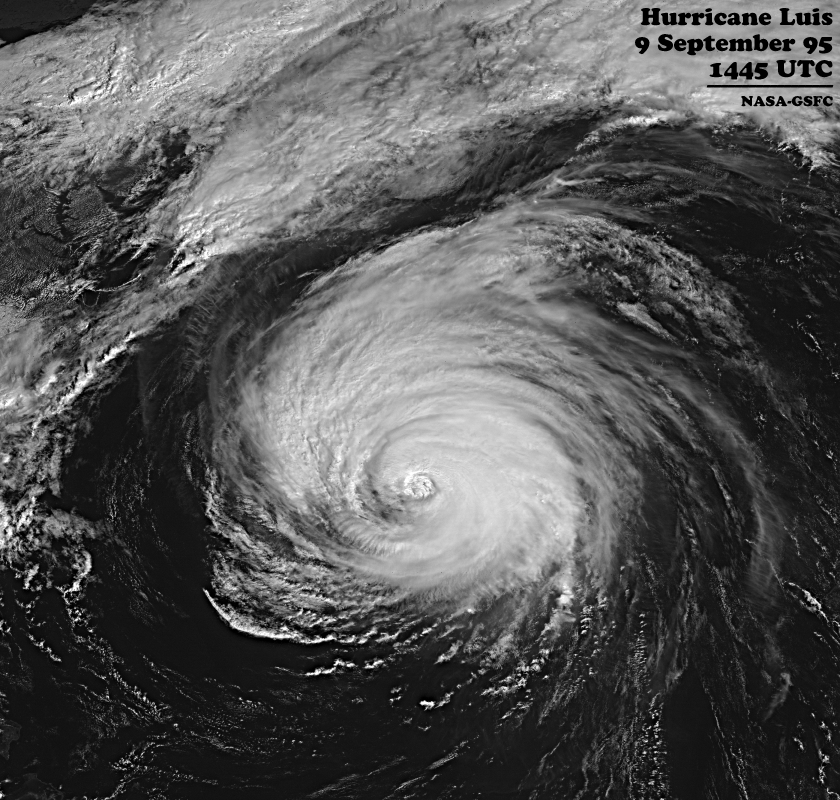
Luis, west of Bermuda

Bermuda reported sustained winds of up to 46 mph (74 km/h). Offshore, the storm produced waves approaching 100 feet (30 m) in height. In total, little to no damage was reported on the island.

=== Eastern United States and offshore ===
Rough seas from the storm affected the East Coast of the United States, resulting in some beach erosion and damage to two waterfront structures on Fire Island. High waves, in combination with high tide, caused significant beach erosion and coastal flooding. On September 7, rip currents produced by Luis caused the death of one person near Corncake Inlet, North Carolina. In Brunswick County, North Carolina, eight homes were washed away by waves, and 40 feet (12 m) of the beach was lost. In nearby Hyde, Carteret, and Onslow counties, waves of up to 17 feet (5.2 m) washed out 33 feet (10 m) of the Triple S Pier in Atlantic Beach, effectively destroying it. Total losses in North Carolina amounted to $1.9 million. In New York, rough seas undermined and destroyed one home, and led to the death of one person who was swimming in the high waves.

=== Atlantic Canada ===
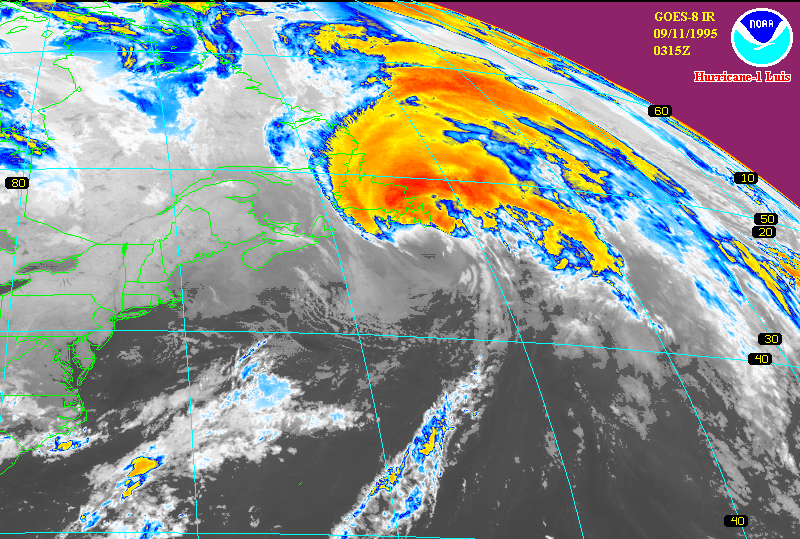
Hurricane Luis' extratropical remnant making landfall in Canada

On September 11, a rogue wave triggered by the remnants of Hurricane Luis slammed the Queen Elizabeth 2 ocean liner when it was about 200 nautical miles (370 km; 230 mi) south of eastern Newfoundland. A nearby Canadian buoy recorded a 98-foot wave (30 m) at roughly the same time. Although the ship did not sustain any significant damage, its arrival in New York was delayed considerably.

Throughout eastern Newfoundland, the system dropped 2.4 to 4.7 inches (61 to 119 mm) of rain at its landfall as a Category 3-equivelant post-tropical cyclone. Northwesterly winds there gusted to 81 mph (130 km/h). The storm caused minor damage to the large province, with flooding costing an estimated $500,000 in damages. One storm-related death was reported in Canada.

== Aftermath ==
=== Antigua, Barbuda, Dominica and St. Kitts and Nevis ===
Several bodies of the United Nations contributed financially to the rebuilding of areas affected by Hurricane Luis. The Office for the Coordination of Human Affairs provided $50,000 in emergency funds to the nation of Antigua and Barbuda, as well as the Netherlands Antilles, while the United Nations Development Programme provided an additional $50,000 to Barbados and the Netherlands Antilles. The Children's Fund additionally provided a cash grant of $20,000 to all affected islands, and the Educational, Scientific and Cultural Organization contributed $20,000 to Antigua and Barbuda, $15,000 to Dominica, and $5,000 to St. Kitts and Nevis for the purposes of rebuilding schools. The Organization of American States, meanwhile, provided an emergency cash grant of $250,000 to Antigua and Barbuda, Dominica, and St. Kitts and Nevis.

The Government of the Bahamas provided $50,000 to affected areas, while the Government of Canada donated $149,253 to the Pan American Health Organization and $44,760 to the impacted region. They were joined by a $150,000 donation from the Government of Japan and $15,873 from the Government of Spain. Antigua and Barbuda received $37,593 from the Government of Australia, $200,000 from the Government of France, and $32,942 from the Government of New Zealand. The Government of Germany provided $52,817 in emergency funds to St. Kitts and Nevis, while the Government of the Netherlands contributed $15.2 million in emergency and recovery funds to the Netherlands Antilles. The Government of Norway provided $50,000 in cash assistance to Antigua and Barbuda and St. Kitts and Nevis.

While most of the support was entirely financial, given in emergency and recovery funds, the European Community Humanitarian Aid Office provided relief goods, such as plastic sheeting, water containers, blankets, and basic medical supplies worth $1.2 million. The Government of Jamaica deployed military recovery teams to affected regions to assist with rehabilitation and cleanup efforts.

=== Saint Martin ===
The degree of devastation left by Hurricane Luis on Saint Martin left the island inaccessible by air or sea for two days. The storm left up to 2,000 citizens homeless, and rendered the island largely without electricity, running water, or telephone service. When transportation resumed, tourists scrambled for a charter flight out of Princess Juliana International Airport. Both the Netherlands and France sent soldiers and police officers to their respective sides of the island, but eyewitnesses and residents reported that the authorities did little to intercede in the widespread looting that followed the hurricane.

Aside from high winds and seeds, Saint Martin was affected by a substantial difference in wind speed forecasts measured at the sea-level airport, and those measured in homes throughout the island hillsides. Sea-level readings showed 86 miles per hour (138 km/h) sustained winds and gusts of up to 114 miles per hour (183 km/h), while hillside measurements showed gusts between 170 and 200 miles per hour (270 and 320 km/h). A sailor that had been sheltered in the lagoon recorded a record 115 miles per hour (185 km/h) wind gust, and a minimal pressure reading to 965 mbar (28.5 inHg).

== Records and retirement ==
On September 11, a 98-foot (30 m) wave struck the RMS Queen Elizabeth II as a result of Luis. This wave is the largest ever officially recorded, although Hurricane Ivan may have produced a wave of up to 130 feet (40 m) high off the coast of Mexico in 2004.

Hurricane Luis was the only hurricane or hurricane remnant to make landfall in Canada at major hurricane strength, having made landfall in Newfoundland as a Category 3-equivelant extratropical cyclone with 120 mph (190 km/h) sustained winds. However, these major hurricane-force winds remained offshore, limiting damage in Newfoundland.

Due to the severe damage and loss of life caused by the storm in the Leeward Islands, the name Luis was retired in the spring of 1996 by the World Meteorological Organization. It was replaced with Lorenzo for the 2001 Atlantic hurricane season.

== See also ==
- Timeline of the 1995 Atlantic hurricane season
- List of Bermuda hurricanes
- List of Canada hurricanes
- List of Category 4 Atlantic hurricanes
- Hurricane Hortense (1996)
- Hurricane Earl (2010)
- Hurricane Igor (2010)
- Hurricane Jose (2017)
- Hurricane Fiona (2022)
