= List of named storms (I) =

Storms are named for historical reasons to avoid confusion when communicating with the public, as more than one storm can exist at a time. Names are drawn in order from predetermined lists. For tropical cyclones, names are assigned when a system has one-, three-, or ten-minute winds of more than 65 km/h (40 mph). Standards, however, vary from basin to basin. For example, some tropical depressions are named in the Western Pacific, while within the Australian and Southern Pacific regions, the naming of tropical cyclones are delayed until they have gale-force winds occurring more than halfway around the storm center.

This list covers the letter I.

== Storms ==
Note: † indicates the name was retired after that usage in the respective basin

- Iadine (1981) – a severe tropical storm that made landfall in Madagascar.
- Ialy (2024) – a Category 1 tropical cyclone that affected the Seychelles, Tanzania and Kenya.
- Ian

- 1982 – a Category 3 severe tropical cyclone which influenced Western Australia.
- 1987 – remained over open waters.
- 1992† – a Category 4 severe tropical cyclone that made landfall Western Australia.
- 1996 – approached Japan.
- 1997 – remained over open waters.
- 2014† – a Category 5 severe tropical cyclone that affected include Fiji and Tonga in Tonga.
- 2016 – tropical storm in the central Atlantic Ocean that never affected land.
- 2022† – extremely destructive and deadly Category 5 hurricane that made landfall in western Cuba, southwestern Florida, and South Carolina.

- Iana (1989) – passed through Madagascar as a tropical storm.
- Ianos (2020) – powerful and rare Medicane that impacted Greece in September 2020.
- Iarima (1986) – formed south-southeast of Diego Garcia; did not affect any landmass.
- Iarisena (1988) – did not affect land
- Iba (2019) – first tropical storm in the South Atlantic since Anita.
- Ibiang

- 1965 – tropical storm that affected Philippines and Japan.
- 1969 – a Category 2 typhoon that made landfall in the Japan.
- 1973 – a Category 1 typhoon that affected in the Philippines and Indochina.
- 1967 – severe tropical storm that made landfall Taiwan and South Japan.
- 1981 – made landfall in China.
- 1985 – the worst tropical cyclone to affect Southern China in 16 years.
- 1989 – struck northern Vietnam.
- 1993 – did not affect land.
- 1997 – among the largest tropical cyclones on record; severely impacted areas of northern China.

- Ida

- 1945 – struck Japan; known as the Makurazaki typhoon.
- 1950 – not areas land.
- 1954 – was the strongest storm of 1954, and made landfall in China.
- 1958 – sixth-deadliest typhoon to hit Japan and one of the strongest cyclones on record; struck Japan and was also known as the Kanogawa typhoon.
- 1961 – struck Japan.
- 1964 – struck northeastern Luzon and southeastern China near Hong Kong.
- 1966 – struck Japan.
- 1968 – affected Réunion.
- 1969 – not areas land.
- 1971 – in the Coral Sea, never threatened land.
- 1972 (May) – near the Solomon Islands causing $70 million in damage.
- 1972 (September) – Affected no areas of land
- 1975 – a category 2 typhoon, recurved out to sea.
- 1980 – passed south of Taiwan and moved ashore in China just north of Hong Kong.
- 1983 – a small cyclone, no damage occurred within Japan.
- 1986 – made landfall in the Philippines.
- 2009 – a late-season hurricane that struck Nicaragua and later the United States Gulf Coast as an extratropical cyclone, which helped form a nor'easter that affected the Northeast United States; Ida caused four deaths and $11.4 million in damage.
- 2015 – a weak but long-lived tropical storm in the eastern Atlantic Ocean.
- 2021† – a Category 4 hurricane that became the strongest hurricane to make landfall in Louisiana in terms of windspeeds and the fifth-costliest hurricane to affect the United States.

- Idai (2019) – a Category 4 tropical cyclone that made landfall in the Mozambique; deadliest cyclone on record in the basin.
- Idalia (2023) – a powerful Category 4 hurricane that caused significant damage in the southeastern United States, especially in Northern Florida.
- Idylle (1979) – crossed to the Australian Region on April 13; stayed out at sea for most of its life.
- Iggy

- 2012 – a Category 2 tropical cyclone that made landfall in the Western Australia as tropical depression.
- 2026 – a Category 1 tropical cyclone that stayed well at sea.

- Igme

- 2004 – a powerful storm that affected the Philippines, Taiwan, and China.
- 2008 – made landfall in Taiwan as a Category 2 typhoon.
- 2012 – affected South Korea due to an interaction with Typhoon Bolaven.
- 2016 – powerful typhoon that made landfall in South Korea.
- 2020 – affected South Korea, but made landfall in North Korea.
- 2024 – a tropical depression that made landfall in Eastern China..

- Ignacio

- 1979 – a Category 4 hurricane that made landfall as a tropical depression in southwestern Mexico.
- 1985 – a Category 4 hurricane that briefly affected Hawaii.
- 1991 – a strong tropical storm that caused deadly flooding in southwestern Mexico.
- 1997 – a weak tropical storm whose remnants affected the U.S. West Coast.
- 2003 – a Category 2 hurricane that made landfall on southern Baja California Sur.
- 2009 – moderate tropical storm that didn't affect land.
- 2015 – a powerful and long-lived Category 4 hurricane over the open ocean.
- 2021 – a weak tropical storm that didn't affect land.

- Igor (2010)† – a very large tropical cyclone which became the most destructive on record to strike the Canadian island of Newfoundland.
- Ikala (2002) – did not affect land.
- Ike

- 1981 – tropical storm that struck Taiwan and affected the Philippines, killing 8 people.
- 1984† – a powerful typhoon that struck the Philippine island of Mindanao and later southern China, causing 1,474 deaths and $230 million in damage.
- 2008† – a powerful hurricane that struck Turks and Caicos, the Bahamas, Cuba, and Texas, causing 214 deaths and $38 billion in damage.

- Ikola (2015) – crossed to the Australian region on April 6; did not affect land.
- Ikonjo (1990) – rare storm that affected Seychelles.
- Ileana

- 1994 – a Category 1 hurricane that affected the Baja California Peninsula.
- 2000 – affected the coast of Mexico.
- 2006 – a Category 3 hurricane that briefly threatened Mexico but turned away.
- 2012 – a Category 1 hurricane that did not affect land.
- 2018 – briefly affected the coast of Mexico, before being absorbed by Hurricane John.
- 2024 – a weak tropical storm that affected Baja California and Western Mexico.

- Iletta (1997) – did not affect land.
- Iliang

- 1966 – brushed the northern part of the Philippines and Taiwan before hitting southern China.
- 1970 – struck Kyūshū and affected the rest of western Japan, killing 11 people.
- 1974 – made landfall in the Philippines one day before the Miss Universe 1974 beauty pageant, killing 66.
- 1978 – minimal typhoon which affected the Ryukyu Islands before dissipating south of the Korean Peninsula.
- 1982 – strong typhoon that made landfall in Taiwan and southern China but later caused minimal damage.
- 1986 – skirted the Philippine and Japanese coasts before becoming an extratropical cyclone, claiming 14 lives.
- 1990 – deadly typhoon which affected the Philippines, the Ryukyu Islands, eastern China and South Korea, killing 108–195 people.
- 1994 – paralleled the eastern seaboard of the Philippines before making landfall in Taiwan and China, claiming at least 36 lives.
- 1998† – tied with Cyclones Ron and Susan as the most intense tropical cyclone worldwide in 1998; severely affected the Philippines, Taiwan and Japan, killing a total of 122.

- Ilona (1988)† – a severe tropical cyclone that caused moderate damage across the Pilbara region of Western Australia in 1988.
- Ilsa

- 1958 – a Category 2 hurricane that stayed out at sea, interacted with Helene.
- 1967 – a strong tropical storm that stayed out at sea.
- 1971 – a Category 3 hurricane that stayed out at sea.
- 1975 – stayed out at sea; remnants contributed to the formation of an unnamed hurricane that existed from late August to early September.
- 1999 – a Category 2 tropical cyclone that made landfall in Western Australia.
- 2009 – a Category 4 severe tropical cyclone that stayed out at sea.
- 2023† – a Category 5 severe tropical cyclone that caused a record-breaking windspeed measurement in Bedout Island.

- Ima (1986)† – affected French Polynesia, causing extensive damage to Rimatara.
- Iman (2021) – made landfall in Mozambique as a tropical depression
- Imani (2010) – did not affect any land areas while moving southwards.
- Imboa (1984) – long-lived system that affected Madagascar and Mozambique.
- Imbudo (2003)† – intense typhoon that made landfall in Northern Philippines and China.
- Imelda

- 2013 – a Category 2 tropical cyclone that affected in Rodrigues.
- 2019 – short-lived weak tropical storm that made landfall in Texas where it caused devastating flooding.
- 2025 – a Category 1 hurricane that affected the Greater Antilles, The Bahamas and Bermuda.

- Imogen (2021) – a Category 1 tropical cyclone that affected Northern Australia.
- In-fa

- 2015 – formed southeast of Kosrae; did not affect land.
- 2021 – Category 2 typhoon, made landfalls in the Putuo District of Zhoushan and Pinghu, China.
- 2026 – a Category 4 super typhoon that impacted the Mariana Islands and Pacific Coast of Honshu.

- Indang (1993) – a long-lived tropical depression that made landfall in the Philippines.
- Inday

- 2002 – affected Guam a week after Typhoon Chataan made landfall and caused heavy damage.
- 2006 – affected Taiwan.
- 2010 – typhoon that made landfall in Taiwan and China, causing $1 billion (USD) in damages and 105 deaths.
- 2014 – a long-lived system that caused heavy rains over Japan and South Korea.
- 2018 – affected the Ryukyu Islands and made landfall in China, leaving 1 dead and $241 million in damages.
- 2022 – the most powerful typhoon to hit Shanghai since Typhoon Gloria in 1949.
- 2026 – a powerful and long-lived Category 5 super typhoon that ravaged the Northern Mariana Islands and China.

- Indlala (2007) – powerful tropical cyclone that made landfall in Antalaha, Madagascar.
- Indusa (2026) – a Category 2 tropical cyclone that stayed out at sea.
- Ineng

- 2003 – only recognized by JTWC.
- 2007 – struck Taiwan and China.
- 2011 – struck Japan.
- 2015 – affected Korea and struck Japan; although causing P1 billion in damages, it was not retired by PAGASA.
- 2019 – affected Taiwan and China.
- 2023 – a weak tropical storm minimal affected Japan.

- Ines

- 1973 – a Category 3 tropical cyclone passed north of Bathurst and Melville islands made landfall in Kimberley, Western Australia.
- 1975 – a strong tropical storm affected Madagascar.

- Inez

- 1947 – a category 3 typhoon, affected Taiwan and China.
- 1966† – a powerful major hurricane that affected the Caribbean, Bahamas, Florida, and Mexico in 1966.

- Inga

- 1961 – a strong tropical storm formed in the Gulf of Mexico, causing minor damage to the coast of Mexico.
- 1969 – a Category 2 hurricane is the third longest-lasting Atlantic hurricane on record.

- Ingrid

- 1946 – struck the Philippines and southern China.
- 1964 – short-lived cyclone that moved southeastward over the Indian Ocean.
- 1970 – struck Western Australia.
- 1984 – tropical cyclone off the northeast coast of Queensland.
- 1995 – passed between Mauritius and Rodrigues and proceeded southward through the Indian Ocean.
- 2005† – a powerful cyclone that struck Queensland, Northern Territory, and Western Australia, causing five deaths and $14.4 million in damage.
- 2007 – short-lived tropical storm east of the Lesser Antilles.
- 2013† – minimal hurricane that struck eastern Mexico at the same time Manuel affected the country's west coast; Ingrid caused 32 deaths and $1.5 billion in damage.

- Iniang (1968) – a strong tropical storm that made landfall in the Japan.
- Inigo (2003)† – a 2003 cyclone that struck Indonesia and tied with Cyclone Gwenda for being the most intense recorded cyclone in the Australian region in terms of pressure, with the possible exception of Cyclone Mahina.
- Iniki (1992)† – most powerful hurricane to strike Hawaii on record; third-costliest United States hurricane at the time.
- Ining

- 1964 – struck the Philippines.
- 1971 – a Category 5 super typhoon, remained at sea, affecting only shipping and causing minor damage to the islands of the West Pacific.

- Innis

- 1992 – briefly threatened Vanuatu.
- 2009 – passed through Vanuatu, New Caledonia, and New Zealand as a weak cyclone.

- Innocente (2000) – produced heavy rainfall to Mauritius.
- Io (1977) – (As Jack) crossed into the South-west Indian Ocean, renamed Io; stayed out at sea.
- Ioke (2006)† – fifth-most intense Pacific hurricane on record, also known as Typhoon Ioke in the Western Pacific.
- Iona (2025) – a Category 4 major hurricane crossed the internacional data line as a tropical depression.
- Ione

- 1948 – made landfall in Japan.
- 1955† – moved over eastern North Carolina as a minimal hurricane, causing further damage in the state after hurricanes Connie and Diane earlier that year.
- 1966 – affected Mexico.
- 1970 (July #1) – did not make landfall.
- 1970 (July #2) – did not make landfall.
- 1974 – stayed out at sea.

- Ionia (1993) – affected Mozambique and Madagascar.
- Iota (2020)† – a devastating late-season Category 4 Atlantic hurricane which caused severe damage to areas of Central America already devastated by Hurricane Eta just less than two weeks prior.
- Iphigenie (1971) – stayed out at sea.
- Ira

- 1990 – struck Vietnam.
- 1993 – struck the Philippines

- Irah

- 1963 – a weak tropical storm, hit on Hawaii as a tropical depression.
- 1968 – did not make landfall.
- 1979 – a category 2 hurricane made landfall on Baja California and entered the Gulf of California as a tropical storm, making landfall again in northwestern Mexico.

- Irena (1978) – affected Madagascar
- Irene

- 1947 – late-season tropical storm that moved through the Philippines.
- 1953 – off-season tropical storm which never made landfall.
- 1959 – dropped heavy rainfall when it struck the Florida panhandle as a minimal tropical storm.
- 1963 – struck Madagascar shortly before dissipating.
- 1969 – did not make landfall.
- 1971 – low-latitude hurricane that crossed Nicaragua, killing three people; was renamed Hurricane Olivia upon reaching the eastern Pacific Ocean.
- 1977 – skirted the northern coast of Western Australia, but ultimately affected no land areas.
- 1981 – major hurricane that traversed the Atlantic Ocean, affecting France as an extratropical cyclone.
- 1999 – slow-moving hurricane that struck Cuba and Florida, causing 18 deaths and $800 million in damage.
- 2005 – hurricane that passed between North Carolina and Bermuda, generating high surf that killed one person.
- 2011† – Category 3 hurricane that moved from the Caribbean to North Carolina and New England, causing 57 deaths and $14.2 billion in damage.
- 2023 – a category 2 tropical cyclone affected Vanuatu and New Caledonia.

- Irina (2012) – cyclone that brought gusty winds to Madagascar, Mozambique and South Africa; claimed 77 lives.
- Iris

- 1951 – a Category 5 made landfall in the Philippines, the typhoon caused nine fatalities and injured an additional 39 people.
- 1955 – Category 1 hit Taiwan and China.
- 1959 – a catastrophic tropical cyclone that killed as many as 2,334 people in China.
- 1962 – five deaths reported and no estimated damage to crops on the islands.
- 1964 – Category 1 which struck Vietnam.
- 1965 – tropical storm that struck Madagascar.
- 1967 – a weak tropical storm hit China.
- 1970 – Category 3 the first typhoon to develop over the South China Sea in October since 1957.
- 1973 – Category 2 made landfall South Korea.
- 1976 – Category 1 meandered over the South China Sea and struck South China.
- 1989 – tropical storm that dissipated in the outflow of Hurricane Hugo.
- 1995 – crossed over the Lesser Antilles, causing four deaths on Martinique, later reached Europe as a strong extratropical storm.
- 1999 – did not make landfall.
- 2000 – a category 3 tropical cyclone (Australian scale) impact Fiji.
- 2001† – struck Belize as a Category 4 storm, killing several in Central America, including 20 on a ship that capsized off the coast, and caused $66 million in damage to Belize.
- 2018 – a Category 2 tropical cyclone (Australian scale), did not make landfall.

- Irma

- 1949 – a weak tropical storm that affected Taiwan.
- 1953 – a powerful Category 3 typhoon that weakened before reaching the coast of the Philippines.
- 1957 – brought torrential rains and high winds to Vietnam, resulting in nine fatalities and an estimated $2 million in damage.
- 1960 – tropical depression that passed the northern coast of the Philippines.
- 1963 – did not make landfall.
- 1966 – strong typhoon that made landfall in the Philippines.
- 1967 – did not make landfall.
- 1968 – a category 1 tropical cyclone; stayed out at sea.
- 1971 – tenth-most intense Pacific typhoon on record; stayed out at sea for most of its life.
- 1974 – the last of the year's 8 typhoons to hit the Philippines.
- September 1978 – short-lived typhoon that made landfall in Taiwan then Japan as a tropical storm.
- October 1978 – short-lived tropical storm that passed over the Azores.
- 1981 – powerful typhoon that made landfall in the Philippines, causing $63.3 million in damages and 595 deaths.
- 1985 – made landfall in Japan as a typhoon.
- 1987 – cyclone that made landfall in the Northern Territory as a Category 2 in the AUS scale.
- 1988 – did not make landfall.
- 1989 – a powerful Category 5 typhoon mostly stayed at sea.
- 1993 – shied away from land masses.
- 2017† – Category 5 hurricane that struck the Leeward Islands, the Bahamas, Cuba, and Florida, causing 134 deaths and $77.16 billion in damage.

- Irna (1992) – stayed out at sea and crossed the basin as Jane.
- Irving

- 1979 – struck South Korea.
- 1982 – a mid-season tropical cyclone that affected the Philippines and China during September 1982.
- 1985 – approached southern Vietnam.
- 1989 – struck northern Vietnam.
- 1992 – an early-season tropical cyclone that struck southern Japan during August 1992.
- 1995 – a weak tropical stormmade landfall on the Leizhou Peninsula.
- 2018 – a category 2 tropical cyclones, mostly stayed at sea.

- Irwin

- 1981 – affected Southern Baja California as a tropical depression.
- 1987 – affected the coast of Mexico; caused no damage.
- 1993 – tropical storm that affected Mexico before being absorbed by Hurricane Hilary.
- 1999 – affected Southern Mexico; caused minimal damage and no deaths.
- 2005 – tropical storm that had no effect in land.
- 2011 – caused no effect to land.
- 2017 – Category 2 hurricane that had no effect on land.
- 2023 – a weak tropical storm, never threatened land.

- Isa

- 1970 – formed near the Solomon Islands
- 1997 – the first of a record eleven super typhoons to occur during the 1997.

- Isaac

- 1982† – a powerful tropical cyclone struck Tonga.
- 1988 – a disorganized tropical storm that moved through the Lesser Antilles, killing two people on Trinidad.
- 2000 – long-lived Cape Verde hurricane that produced heavy surf along the east coast of the United States; the storm overturned a boat in Moriches Inlet near New York, killing one person.
- 2006 – minimal hurricane that brushed Newfoundland.
- 2012 – minimal hurricane that produced widespread flooding when it struck Louisiana, causing 41 deaths and $3.1 billion in damage.
- 2018 – a Category 1 hurricane threatened the Lesser Antilles.
- 2024 – a Category 2 hurricane that caused minor damage in the Azores.

- Isabeau (1982) - designated as a tropical depression; possibly affected Madagascar (including Fort Dauphin) and Reunion with minimal impact.
- Isabel

- 1962 – a weak tropical cyclone that formed in the southeast of Madagascar and remained mostly at sea.
- 1985 – the precursor caused deadly flooding and landslides in Puerto Rico, killing 180 people; as a minimal tropical storm it struck Florida.
- 2003† – a long-lived Category 5 hurricane that later weakened and struck North Carolina, causing 51 deaths and $5.5 billion in damage.

- Isaias

- 2020 – a Category 1 hurricane that caused extensive damage across the Caribbean and the East Coast of the United States; also was the earliest ninth named Atlantic basin storm.
- 2026 – a Category 3 hurricane that impacted the Gulf Coast of the United States; also tied a record for the latest-forming first Atlantic hurricane of a season set in 1905.

- Isang

- 1964 – a category 1 typhoon that mostly stayed at sea.
- 1968 – struck the southern islands of Kyūshū and Shikoku. Heavy flooding killed 25 people and left 2 missing.
- 1972 – traveling north of the island of Taiwan before making landfall in China.
- 1976 – did not threaten land.
- 1980 – made landfall in the Philippines.
- 1984 – a category 1 typhoon affected South Korea, Japan, and the Soviet Union during August 1984.
- 1988 – a weak tropical storm hit eastern China as a 45 mph tropical storm. Torrential rains and heavy flooding resulted in 110 casualties and widespread damage to roads and dams.
- 1992 – hit southeastern Taiwan, and on the 31st it hit China triggered devastating floods that killed 202 people and injured hundreds more.
- 1996 – hit Japan caused heavy flooding, resulting in at least 2 deaths and moderate damage.
- 2000 – the strongest tropical cyclone in the western Pacific during 2000 and wrought considerable damage in Taiwan and China in August of that year.
- 2001 – one of the deadliest tropical cyclones to hit the island country of Taiwan, since 1961.
- 2005 (March) – a relatively strong tropical storm which stayed at sea.
- 2005 (August) – a strong tropical cyclone that passed over Taiwan on the night of August 31 to September 1, 2005, and over Southeast China on September 2.
- 2009 – struck China.
- 2013 – a weak tropical storm, with only a pressure of 1000 hectopascals and 45 mph, it formed and made landfall in the Philippines, especially Luzon, and China, as well as affecting Southern Taiwan during its nearby passage.
- 2017 – a strong tropical cyclone that struck South China in August 2017.
- 2021 – long-lived system which eventually affected the southern Japanese islands and hit the Korean Peninsula as a remnant low.
- 2025 – a Category 2 typhoon skirted Hainan Island and made landfall in Vietnam..

- Iselle

- 1984 – a Category 4 hurricane that passed along the coast of Mexico and only slightly affected
- 1990 – did not affect land.
- 2002 – a powerful tropical storm that had little impact on the California Peninsula.
- 2008 – no threat to land.
- 2014 – the strongest tropical cyclone to make landfall on the Big Island of Hawaii in recorded history.
- 2020 – stayed in the open ocean.
- 2026 – stayed in the open ocean.

- Iseult (1970) – affected Mauritius.
- Isidore

- 1984 – tropical storm that moved across the southeastern United States, killing one person near Orlando, Florida due to electrocution
- 1990 – formed at an unusually low latitude, and traveled generally northward across the Atlantic Ocean without affecting land
- 1996 – a major hurricane that formed and moved from the tropical to the northern Atlantic Ocean without affecting land
- 2002† – a Category 3 hurricane that struck western Cuba and the Yucatán causing $330 million in damage and seven deaths.

- Ising

- 1963 – struck northern Luzon in the Philippines as a Category 2 typhoon before entering the South China Sea where it made a second landfall in China
- 1967 – heavy rains caused 69 fatalities and a further 32 people to be reported as missing.
- 1971 – a weak tropical storm affected Philippines.
- 1975 – struck Taiwan and China.
- 1979 – Category 4 super typhoon, brushed Taiwan then struck southern China; subsequently restrengthened to a severe tropical storm in the Bay of Bengal.
- 1983 – a deadly and destructive Category 5 super typhoon that hit Japan.
- 1987 – made landfall on Luzon, Philippines, and later in northern Vietnam.
- 1991 – affected Japan and South Korea.
- 1995 – approached Luzon before curving out to sea
- 1999 – killed 106 people in North and South Korea and caused US$657 million in damages

- Isis

- 1973 – a storm made landfall in Northern Madagascar.
- 1980 – never threatening land.
- 1986 – never threatening land.
- 1992 – never threatening land.
- 1998 – a minimal hurricane that affected in Baja California Sur and Mexico killed 14 people.
- 2004† – a category 1 hurricane that remained at sea and did not affect land.

- Ismael

- 1983 – a minimal hurricane that brought heavy rainfall to western Mexico and the southwestern United States, killing four people and leaving $19 million in damage.
- 1989 – long-lived major hurricane that killed three people in Colima, Mexico
- 1995† – minimal hurricane that struck the Mexican state of Sinaloa, killing 116 people

- Isobel

- 1974 – was no threat to land.
- 1985 – did not affect land.
- 1996 – did not pass close to any land.
- 2007 – made landfall along the north-west coast of Western Australia; its remnants merged with a deep low-pressure system and pummeled the region with torrential rains and high winds.

- Issa (2022) – exacerbated catastrophic floodings in KwaZulu-Natal that killed 435 people.
- Ita

- 1997 – a weak tropical cyclones minimal wind damage, moderate flooding in rivers and creeks, and a tornado that occurred in Yukan.
- 2014† – a severe tropical cyclone that struck the Solomon Islands, Queensland and affected Papua New Guinea causing 40 deaths.

- Itelle (1996) - powerful system that affected Madagascar shortly after dissipation, mostly stayed out at sea.
- Item

- 1950 – struck a sparsely populated part of Veracruz
- 1951 – moved slowly through the western Caribbean before striking Cuba as a tropical storm.

- Itseng (2004) - (As Oscar) crossed over to the South-west Indian Ocean; stayed out at sea.
- Iune (2015) - stayed out at sea throughout its life.
- Iva

- 1961 – made landfall in Zihuatanejo, Mexico as a Category 1 hurricane.
- 1968 – stayed out at sea.
- 1972 – caused no impact to land while out at sea.
- 1976 – a Category 4 hurricane that stayed out at sea; no possible impact.
- 1978 – stayed out at sea; remnants produced rain in Hawaii.
- 1982 – minimal tropical storm that caused no damage or deaths.
- 1988† – Category 2 hurricane that stayed out at sea.

- Ivan

- 1979 – remained over the open ocean.
- 1980 – formed from extratropical origin south of the Azores, and developed into a Category 2 hurricane while remaining away from land
- 1997 – an intense tropical cyclone that existed simultaneously with another storm of the same intensity, Typhoon Joan, in October 1997.
- 1998 – minimal hurricane that was one of four simultaneous hurricanes on September 26, along with Georges, Jeanne, and Karl
- 2004† – long-lived Category 5 hurricane that moved through the Caribbean and Gulf of Mexico, causing 124 deaths and $26.1 billion in damage
- 2008 – a Category 4 tropical cyclone that made landfall in Madagascar.

- Ivanoe (2014) - stayed out at sea
- Ivette

- 2016 – made landfall east of Hawaii as a remnant low.
- 2022 – did not affect land.

- Ivo

- 2001 – tropical storm that brushed the west coast of Mexico.
- 2007 – hurricane that brought heavy rainfall to Baja California.
- 2013 – tropical storm that brought heavy rainfall to Baja California and California, causing one death.
- 2019 – tropical storm west of Mexico.
- 2025 – strong tropical storm that affected Mexico without making landfall.

- Ivor (1990) - affected Queensland, Australia as a Category 1 equivalent cyclone.
- Ivone (2025) – remained over the open ocean.
- Ivy

- 1952 – did not affect land.
- 1956 – did not affect land.
- 1960 – did not affect land.
- 1962 – did not affect land.
- 1965 – did a loop and only survived 5 days before dissipating.
- 1966 – a powerful tropical cyclone that passed and only slightly affected Madagascar.
- 1967 – did not affect land.
- 1971 – spawned a multi vortex killer tornado that struck Omiya City while damaging many homes and buildings, the tornado killed 1 and injured 11 and it was rated as F3.
- 1972 – did not affect land.
- 1974 – struck Luzon and southeastern China.
- 1976 – stayed at sea.
- 1989 – stayed at sea.
- 1991 – approached Japan.
- 1994 (February) – stayed at sea.
- 1994 (August) – stayed at sea.
- 2004† – a tropical cyclone that affected about 25% of the population of Vanuatu in February 2004.

- Iwa (1982)† – Category 1 hurricane that affected Hawaii (mainly Ni'ihau, Kaua'i, and O'ahu)
- Izilda (2009) - affected Madagascar (in close proximity), and Mozambique; however, it did not cause any damage to both areas.

== See also ==
- European windstorm names
- Atlantic hurricane season
- List of Pacific hurricane seasons
- Tropical cyclone naming
- South Atlantic tropical cyclone
- Tropical cyclone
