= IVO =

Ivo or IVO may refer to:

== Films ==
- Ivo (2024 film), a German drama film

== People ==
- Ivo, a masculine given name
- Lêdo Ivo (1924–2012), Brazilian poet
- Tommy Ivo (born 1936), American actor and drag racer

== Places ==
- Ivó, a village in Zetea, Romania
- Ivo, Ebonyi, a local government area of Nigeria

== Other uses ==
- Health and Social Care Inspectorate (Swedish: Inspektionen för vård och omsorg), of the Government of Sweden
- List of storms named Ivo
- Imatran Voima, now Fortum, a Finnish energy company
- Institute for Public Affairs (Slovakia) (Slovak: Inštitút pre verejné otázky), a Slovak think tank
- Io Volcano Observer, a proposed uncrewed spacecraft

== See also ==
- Ivos (disambiguation)
