= List of storms named Ibiang =

The name Ibiang has been used to name nine tropical cyclones in the Philippine Area of Responsibility in the West Pacific Ocean:

- Tropical Storm Emma (1965) (T6510, 12W, Ibiang) – tropical storm that affected Philippines and Japan.
- Typhoon Cora (1969) (T6909, 09W, Ibiang) – a Category 2 typhoon that made landfall in the Japan.
- Typhoon Marge (1973) ((T7314, 16W, Ibiang) – a Category 1 typhoon that affected in the Philippines and Indochina.
- Tropical Storm Amy (1977) (09W, Ibiang) – severe tropical storm that made landfall Taiwan and South Japan.
- Tropical Storm Nina (1981) (T8109, 09W, Ibiang) – made landfall in China.
- Typhoon Nelson (1985) (T8510, 11W, Ibiang), the worst tropical cyclone to affect Southern China in 16 years
- Tropical Storm Irving (1989) (T8910, 10W, Ibiang) – struck northern Vietnam.
- Tropical Storm Marian (1993) (T9310, 09W, Ibiang) – did not affect land.
- Typhoon Winnie (1997) (T9713, 14W, Ibiang) – among the largest tropical cyclones on record; severely impacted areas of northern China.
