= Irah =

Irah could refer to:

- IRaH, 2024 science fiction film
- Irah Chase (1793–1864), American clergyman
- List of storms named Irah
