= List of storms named Irving =

The name Irving has been used for seven tropical cyclones worldwide: six in the northwest Pacific Ocean and one in the Australian Region.

In the Western Pacific:

- Typhoon Irving (1979) (T7910, 12W) – struck South Korea.
- Typhoon Irving (1982) (T8217, 18W, Ruping) – struck the southern tip of Luzon and China.
- Tropical Storm Irving (1985) (T8527, 26W) – approached southern Vietnam.
- Tropical Storm Irving (1989) (T8910, 10W) – struck northern Vietnam.
- Tropical Storm Irving (1992) (T9209, 09W, Edeng) – struck Japan.
- Tropical Storm Irving (1995) (T9506, 09W, Diding) – struck China.

In the Australian region:

- Cyclone Irving (2018) – a relatively strong cyclone which crossed over to the South-West Indian Ocean and remained at sea.
