= Typhoon Mamie (1985) =

Pacific typhoon in 1985

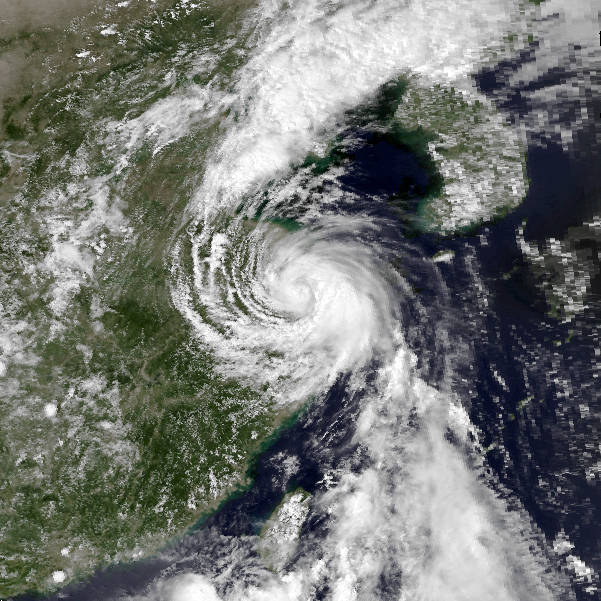
- Typhoon Mamie making landfall over eastern China on August 18

Meteorological history
- Formed: August 15, 1985
- Dissipated: August 21, 1985

Typhoon
- 10-minute sustained (JMA)
- Highest winds: 120 km/h (75 mph)
- Lowest pressure: 975 hPa (mbar); 28.79 inHg

Category 1-equivalent typhoon
- 1-minute sustained (SSHWS/JTWC)
- Highest winds: 130 km/h (80 mph)

Overall effects
- Fatalities: 17 direct
- Areas affected: China
- IBTrACS
- Part of the 1985 Pacific typhoon season

Typhoon Mamie was the worst tropical cyclone to affect northeastern China in 26 years. Originating from an area of disturbed weather near the Philippines in mid-August 1985, the system gradually became better organized, and was upgraded into a tropical storm early on August 16. It continued to deepen, and late on August 17, Mamie attained typhoon intensity. Around this time, Typhoon Mamie reached its peak intensity of 120 km/h (75 mph), which it maintained for 12 hours. After making landfall in Shanghai, the storm steadily weakened. However, after turning north and crossing the Shanghai Peninsula and the Yellow Sea, Mamie made a second landfall near Yantai as a tropical storm. After turning northwest and re-entering the Yellow Sea, Mamie moved ashore for the third and final time near Dairen. On August 21, Mamie dissipated inland over northeastern China.

Due to both Mamie and Nelson, widespread flooding was reported across much of northern China, with 19 rivers overflowing. The typhoon forced around 1,000 factories to temporarily close, and toppled approximately 6.5 million trees. Moreover, about 8,000 homes were flooded and 120,000 houses received damage Nearly 1 million people were directly affected by the typhoon. The typhoon killed more than 120,000 animals and sank more than 200 boats. Overall, 17 fatalities occurred and 165 were injured. Losses totaled $172 million (1985 USD).

== Meteorological history ==
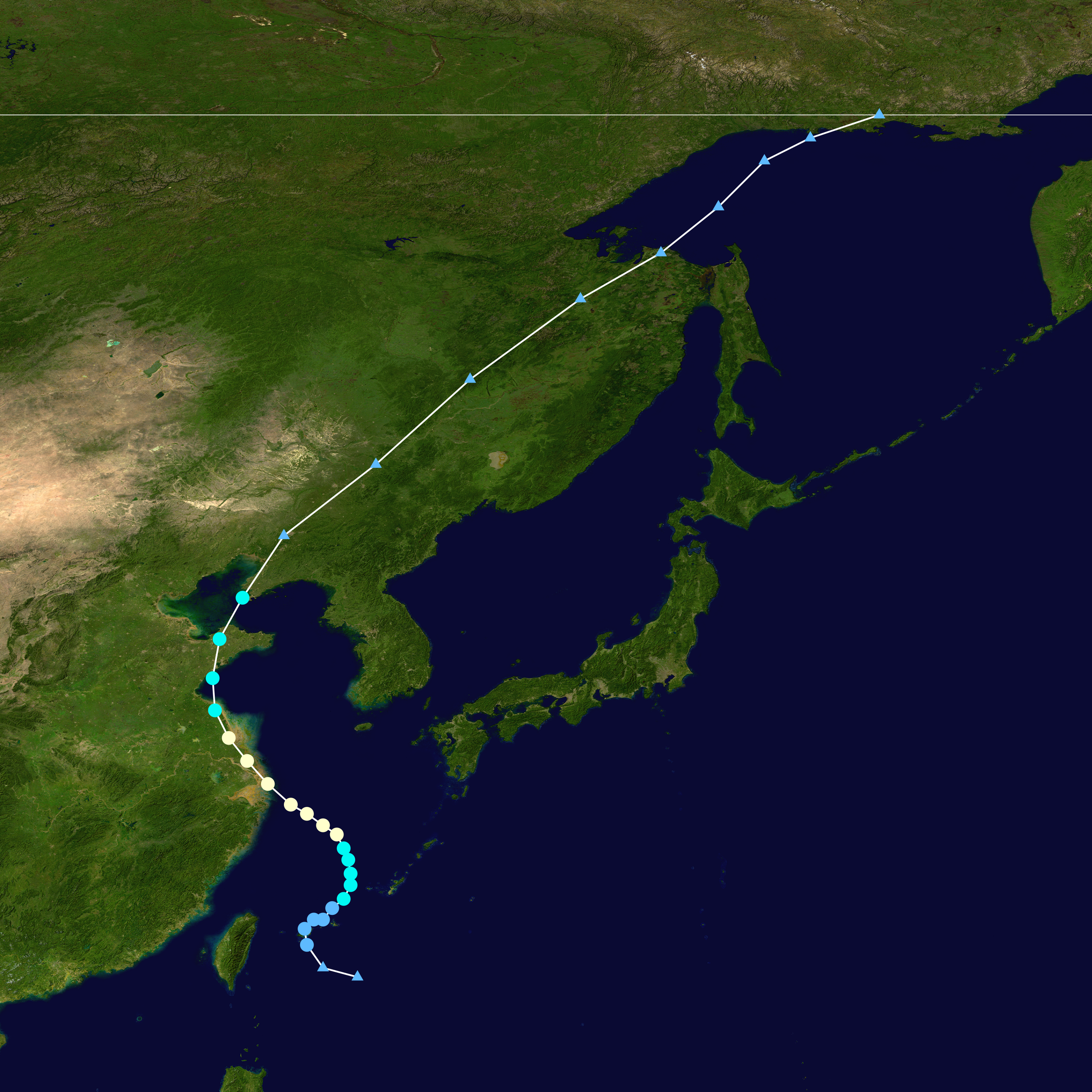
Map plotting the storm's track and intensity, according to the Saffir–Simpson scale Map key Saffir–Simpson scale Tropical depression (≤38 mph, ≤62 km/h) Tropical storm (39–73 mph, 63–118 km/h) Category 1 (74–95 mph, 119–153 km/h) Category 2 (96–110 mph, 154–177 km/h) Category 3 (111–129 mph, 178–208 km/h) Category 4 (130–156 mph, 209–251 km/h) Category 5 (≥157 mph, ≥252 km/h) Unknown Storm type Tropical cyclone Subtropical cyclone Extratropical cyclone, remnant low, tropical disturbance, or monsoon depression

Typhoon Mamie originated from the southwesterly monsoonal flow near the Philippines. The monsoon flow was situated near Tropical Storm Lee, which was situated east of Taiwan at that time. At 0000 UTC on August 14, banding features were noted via satellite imagery. The system was first monitored by the Joint Typhoon Warning Center (JTWC) at 0600 UTC on August 14; the JTWC noted that the chances of significant development were poor. Throughout the day, the system became better organized while turning north and at 1800 UTC that day, the Japan Meteorological Agency (JMA) started watching the disturbance. (Note: The Japan Meteorological Agency is the official Regional Specialized Meteorological Center for the western Pacific Ocean.) Early on August 15, the JTWC remarked that the storm had a "fair" chance at potential development. As such, Hurricane Hunter aircraft was requested. Following an increase in banding features and outflow, a Tropical Cyclone Formation Alert (TCFA) was issued by the JTWC that afternoon. Thereafter, the cyclone began to strengthen as interaction with Tropical Storm Lee diminished. At 2300 UTC on August 15, the aircraft discovered a closed low-level circulation, as well as tropical storm-force winds. Based on this, both agencies designated the system as Tropical Storm Mamie early on August 16. (Note: Wind estimates from the JMA and most other basins throughout the world are sustained over 10 minutes, while estimates from the United States-based Joint Typhoon Warning Center are sustained over 1 minute. 10 minute winds are about 1.14 times the amount of 1 minute winds.)

On August 16, the tropical storm began to turn northwest in response to the strengthening of a subtropical ridge north of Mamie and a westward-moving mid-latitude cyclone. At 0000 UTC on August 17, the JTWC classified Mamie as a typhoon while the JMA reported winds of 105 km/h (65 mph), a severe tropical storm. Around midday, the JTWC estimated winds of 130 km/h (80 mph), equivalent to a Category 1 hurricane on the United States-based Saffir-Simpson Hurricane Wind Scale. However, the aforementioned ridge was not strong enough to prevent the storm from turning north-northwest on August 17. That evening, the JMA upgraded Mamie to typhoon status. Simultaneously, the JMA estimated peak winds of 120 km/h (75 mph), and a minimum barometric pressure of 975 mbar (28.8 inHg). According to the JMA, the typhoon held on to peak intensity for 12 hours while moving onshore near Shanghai on August 18. Mamie only gradually weakened overland, but according to the JMA, the storm's winds had decreased to 105 km/h (65 mph) midday on August 18. Typhoon Mamie moved offshore at 0200 UTC on August 19; subsequently, the JTWC estimated winds of 95 km/h (60 mph) while the JMA estimated winds of 95 km/h (60 mph). After crossing the Shanghai Peninsula, Mamie entered the Yellow Sea while turning north along the western periphery of a subtropical ridge, and at 0600 UTC, struck Yantai as a minimal tropical storm. Following a turn towards the northwest, Tropical Storm Mamie briefly emerged into the Yellow Sea before making a third and final landfall just west of Dairen at noon. At the time of landfall, both the JMA and the JTWC reported winds of 70 km/h (45 mph). Due to interaction with the mountainous terrain of China, Mamie began to dissipate over land, and by 0000 UTC on August 20, the JTWC ceased watching the cyclone. The JMA followed suit 42 hours later.

== Preparations, impact, and aftermath ==
Roughly 24 hours prior to Mamie's third landfall, all ships were warned in the port of Dalian to evacuate; however, 152 ships stayed at the port. Shortly after making landfall, Mamie was considered the worst storm to affect northeastern China in 26 years. The nation was already inundated by significant flooding earlier in the summer of 1985, especially from Typhoon Nelson.

After making landfall, Typhoon Mamie dropped 420 mm (17 in) of rain in Liaoning, where the storm flooded 300,000 ha (741,315 acres) of farmland. Due to a combination of Mamie and previous flooding, 19 rivers overflowed. The typhoon forced 1,000 factories to temporarily close, and toppled about 6.5 million trees. Over 8,000 dwellings were flooded. More than 3,000 residents were evacuated in the Jilin province. At least 36,400 villagers necessitated rescue. Nearly 1 million individuals were directly affected by the typhoon. Elsewhere, in Yantai, the typhoon killed more than 120,000 animals, damaged 120,000 homes, and sank more than 200 boats. Waves up to 8 m (26 ft) in height pounded the Bohai Bay shoreline, forcing more than 200 ships to be evacuated. Cables securing an oil rig were snapped. One person died while trying to fasten steel products on a ship. In all, 17 people perished and 165 were injured due to Mamie. Loses totaled $172 million.

After the passage of Typhoon Mamie, more than 800,000 civilians and 9,000 soldiers were organized in order to protect reservoirs from flooding. By August 28, 150,000 civilians and 10,000 soldiers were fighting against flooding along the Liao River on a daily basis. Additionally, local military forces were called in to assist relief workers. The government organized buses and boats to carry flood victims. Some schools were used as shelter while restaurants and hospitals sent food and medicine.

== See also ==
- Typhoon Rusa
- Typhoon Damrey (2012)
