= Ivos =

Ivos may refer to:

- IV of Spades (IVOS), Filipino pop funk band
- Aleksandar Ivoš, Yugoslav and Serbian footballer

== See also ==
- Ivo (disambiguation)
