= List of storms named Inez =

The name Inez has been used for two tropical cyclones worldwide: one in the Atlantic Ocean and one tropical cyclone in the Western Pacific Ocean.

In the Atlantic:

- Hurricane Inez (1966) – the worst storm of the season. struck Lesser Antilles, Haiti, Cuba, Bahamas, Florida Keys, Yucatán and Mexico.

Following the 1966 season, the name Inez was retired in the Atlantic basin, and was replaced by Isabel for the 1970 season.

In the Western Pacific:

- Typhoon Inez (1947) (T4708) – struck Taiwan and China.
