= List of storms named Ilsa =

The name Ilsa has been used for one tropical cyclone in the Atlantic Ocean, three in the Eastern Pacific Ocean, and three in the Australian region.

In the Atlantic:

- Hurricane Ilsa (1958) – a Category 2 hurricane that engaged in a Fujiwhara interaction with Hurricane Helene and caused beach erosion in Bermuda

In the Eastern Pacific:

- Tropical Storm Ilsa (1967) – did not affect land
- Hurricane Ilsa (1971) – a Category 3 hurricane that did not affect land
- Hurricane Ilsa (1975) – a Category 2 hurricane that contributed to the formation of the 1975 Pacific Northwest hurricane

In the Australian region:

- Cyclone Ilsa (1999) – a Category 2 tropical cyclone that made landfall in Western Australia
- Cyclone Ilsa (2009) – a Category 4 severe tropical cyclone
- Cyclone Ilsa (2023) – a Category 5 severe tropical cyclone that caused a record-breaking windspeed measurement in Bedout Island

== See also ==
Similar names that have also been used for tropical cyclones:

- List of storms named Elsa – used in the Atlantic Ocean and two other tropical cyclone basins
- List of storms named Isa – used in two tropical cyclone basins
