= List of storms named Ita =

The name Ita has been used for two tropical cyclones in the Australian region:

- Cyclone Ita (1997) – a Category 1 tropical cyclone that made landfall southeast of Townsville.
- Cyclone Ita (2014) – a Category 5 severe tropical cyclone that affected the Solomon Islands, Papua New Guinea, Australia, and New Zealand, becoming one of the costliest Australian region tropical cyclones on record.

The name Ita was retired after the 2013–14 season, being replaced with Ivana.

== See also ==
Storms with similar names

- Hurricane Eta (2020) – a Category 4 Atlantic Ocean hurricane that caused over 100 fatalities across Central America, Mexico, and the United States.
- Tropical Storm Iba (2019) – a South Atlantic tropical cyclone.
- Hurricane Iota (2020) – a Category 4 Atlantic hurricane that became the basin's second-strongest November hurricane on record in terms of barometric pressure.
- Hurricane Iwa (1982) – a Central Pacific Ocean hurricane that became the costliest to affect Hawaii at the time.
