= List of storms named Item =

The name Item has been used for two tropical cyclones in the Atlantic Ocean:

- Hurricane Item (1950) – struck a sparsely populated part of Veracruz
- Tropical Storm Item (1951) – moved slowly through the western Caribbean before striking Cuba as a tropical storm.
