= List of storms named Ida =

The name Ida has been used for 19 tropical cyclones worldwide. Three of them were in the Atlantic Ocean, thirteen were in the West Pacific Ocean, one was in the South-West Indian Ocean, and two were in the Australian region.

In the Atlantic Ocean:

Ida replaced the name Isabel following the latter's retirement after the 2003 season.

- Hurricane Ida (2009) – a Category 2 hurricane that made landfall in Nicaragua and Alabama.
- Tropical Storm Ida (2015) – did not affect land.
- Hurricane Ida (2021) – a Category 4 hurricane that became the strongest hurricane to make landfall in Louisiana in terms of windspeeds and the fifth-costliest hurricane to affect the United States. Also affected Venezuela, Cuba, and the Northeastern United States.

The name Ida was retired in the Atlantic after its usage in 2021, and it was replaced by Imani for the 2027 season.

In the West Pacific Ocean:

- Typhoon Ida (1945) – a Category 1-equivalent typhoon that made landfall in Japan, killing over 2,000 people in the Hiroshima Prefecture. Known in Japanese as the Makurazaki Typhoon (枕崎台風).
- Typhoon Ida (1950) (T5020, T5022, T5023) – a Category 1-equivalent typhoon.
- Typhoon Ida (1954) (T5408) – a Category 5-equivalent super typhoon that made landfall in China.
- Typhoon Ida (1958) (T5822) – a Category 5-equivalent super typhoon that became the strongest tropical cyclone worldwide in terms of barometric pressure until Typhoon Nora in 1973. Also made landfall in Japan, killing over 1,000 people and becoming the country's sixth-deadliest typhoon. Known in Japanese as the Kanogawa Typhoon (狩野川台風).
- Typhoon Ida (1961) (T6111, 32W) – a Category 1-equivalent typhoon.
- Typhoon Ida (1964) (T6412, 15W, Seniang) – a Category 4-equivalent super typhoon that affected the Philippines, Hong Kong, and China.
- Typhoon Ida (1966) (T6626, 27W) – a Category 3-equivalent typhoon that made landfall in Japan, killing 275 people.
- Typhoon Ida (1969) (T6915, 19W) – a Category 4-equivalent typhoon that affected the Mariana Islands.
- Typhoon Ida (1972) (T7221, 22W) – a Category 3-equivalent typhoon that did not affect land.
- Typhoon Ida (1975) (T7519, 22W) – a Category 2-equivalent typhoon.
- Typhoon Ida (1980) (T8007, 08W, Lusing) – made landfall in China.
- Tropical Storm Ida (1983) (T8313, 14W, Oniang) – a severe tropical storm that affected the Mariana Islands and Japan.
- Tropical Storm Ida (1986) (T8624, 21W, Uding) – a severe tropical storm that moved across the Philippines.

In the South-West Indian Ocean:

- Tropical Storm Ida (1968) – a severe tropical storm that affected Réunion and Mauritius.

In the Australian region:

- Cyclone Ida (1971) – a Category 2 tropical cyclone that crossed into the South Pacific basin.
- Cyclone Ida (1972) – a Category 3 severe tropical cyclone that crossed into the South Pacific basin.

== See also ==
- Nor'Ida (2009) – a nor'easter that formed from the remnants of 2009's Hurricane Ida and affected the East Coast of the United States.

Similar names that have been used for tropical cyclones:

- Tropical Storm Iba (2019) – used in the South Atlantic Ocean.
- Cyclone Idai (2019) – used in the South-West Indian Ocean.
- Hurricane Iwa (1982) – used in the Central Pacific Ocean.
