= List of storms named Ines =

The name Ines has been used for one tropical cyclone in the South-West Indian Ocean and one tropical cyclone in the Australian Region.

Ine the South-West Indian Ocean:

- Tropical Storm Ines (1975) – a strong tropical storm affected Madagascar.

In the Australian Region:

- Cyclone Ines (1973) – a Category 3 tropical cyclone passed north of Bathurst and Melville islands made landfall in Kimberley, Western Australia.
