= List of storms named Iliang =

The name Iliang was used for nine tropical cyclones in the Philippines by PAGASA and its predecessor, the Philippine Weather Bureau, in the Western Pacific Ocean.

- Severe Tropical Storm Mamie (1966) (T6606, 06W, Iliang) – brushed the northern part of the Philippines and Taiwan before hitting southern China.
- Typhoon Wilda (1970) (T7009, 10W, Iliang) – struck Kyūshū and affected the rest of western Japan, killing 11 people.
- Typhoon Ivy (1974) (T7410, 11W, Iliang) – made landfall in the Philippines one day before the Miss Universe 1974 beauty pageant, killing 66.
- Typhoon Carmen (1978) (T7811, 12W, Iliang) – minimal typhoon which affected the Ryukyu Islands before dissipating south of the Korean Peninsula.
- Typhoon Andy (1982) (T8209, 10W, Iliang) – strong typhoon that made landfall in Taiwan and southern China but later caused minimal damage.
- Severe Tropical Storm Sarah (1986) (T8610, 09W, Iliang) – skirted the Philippine and Japanese coasts before becoming an extratropical cyclone, claiming 14 lives.
- Typhoon Abe (1990) (T9015, 15W, Iliang) – deadly typhoon which affected the Philippines, the Ryukyu Islands, eastern China and South Korea, killing 108–195 people.
- Typhoon Tim (1994) (T9405, 08W, Iliang) – paralleled the eastern seaboard of the Philippines before making landfall in Taiwan and China, claiming at least 36 lives.
- Typhoon Zeb (1998) (T9810, 18W, Iliang) – tied with Cyclones Ron and Susan as the most intense tropical cyclone worldwide in 1998; severely affected the Philippines, Taiwan and Japan, killing a total of 122.

Due to the widespread destruction caused by its 1998 iteration, the name Iliang was retired by PAGASA after 1998; however, no replacement name was issued after the agency implemented major changes to its typhoon name list in 2001.
