= List of storms named Irwin =

The name Irwin has been used for eight tropical cyclones in the Eastern Pacific Ocean.

- Tropical Storm Irwin (1981)
- Tropical Storm Irwin (1987)
- Tropical Storm Irwin (1993)
- Tropical Storm Irwin (1999)
- Tropical Storm Irwin (2005) – no threat to land
- Hurricane Irwin (2011) – Category 2 hurricane, no threat to land
- Hurricane Irwin (2017) – Category 1 hurricane, no threat to land
- Tropical Storm Irwin (2023) – a weak tropical storm, never threatened land
