= List of storms named Iggy =

The name Iggy has been used for two tropical cyclones in the Australian region.

- Cyclone Iggy (2012) – a Category 2 tropical cyclone that made landfall in the Western Australia as tropical depression.
- Cyclone Iggy (2026) – a Category 1 tropical cyclone that stayed well at sea.
