= List of storms named Inga =

The name Inga has been used for two tropical cyclones in the Atlantic Ocean:

- Tropical Storm Inga (1961) – a strong tropical storm formed in the Gulf of Mexico, causing minor damage to the coast of Mexico.
- Hurricane Inga (1969) – a Category 2 hurricane that became one of the longest-lasting Atlantic hurricanes on record.
