= List of storms named Ira =

The name Ira has been used for two tropical cyclones in the West Pacific Ocean:

- Tropical Storm Ira (1990)
- Typhoon Ira (1993) (T9323, 30W) – struck the Philippines.

== See also ==
Storms with similar names

- Tropical Storm Iba (2019) – a South Atlantic Ocean tropical cyclone.
- Hurricane Iwa (1982) – a Central Pacific hurricane that became the costliest to affect Hawaii at the time.
