= List of storms named Iselle =

The name Iselle has been used for seven tropical cyclones in the East Pacific Ocean:

- Hurricane Iselle (1984)
- Hurricane Iselle (1990)
- Tropical Storm Iselle (2002)
- Tropical Storm Iselle (2008) – no threat to land
- Hurricane Iselle (2014) – a Category 4 hurricane that made landfall on the Big Island of Hawaii as a tropical storm
- Tropical Storm Iselle (2020) – stayed in the open ocean
- Tropical Storm Iselle (2026) – no threat to land

== See also ==
Storms with similar names

- Cyclone Giselle (1969) – capsized the TEV Wahine offshore New Zealand, causing 53 fatalities
- Hurricane Isbell (1964) – a Category 3 Atlantic Ocean hurricane
