= Typhoon Kirk (1996) =

Pacific typhoon in 1996

Typhoon Kirk (Isang)
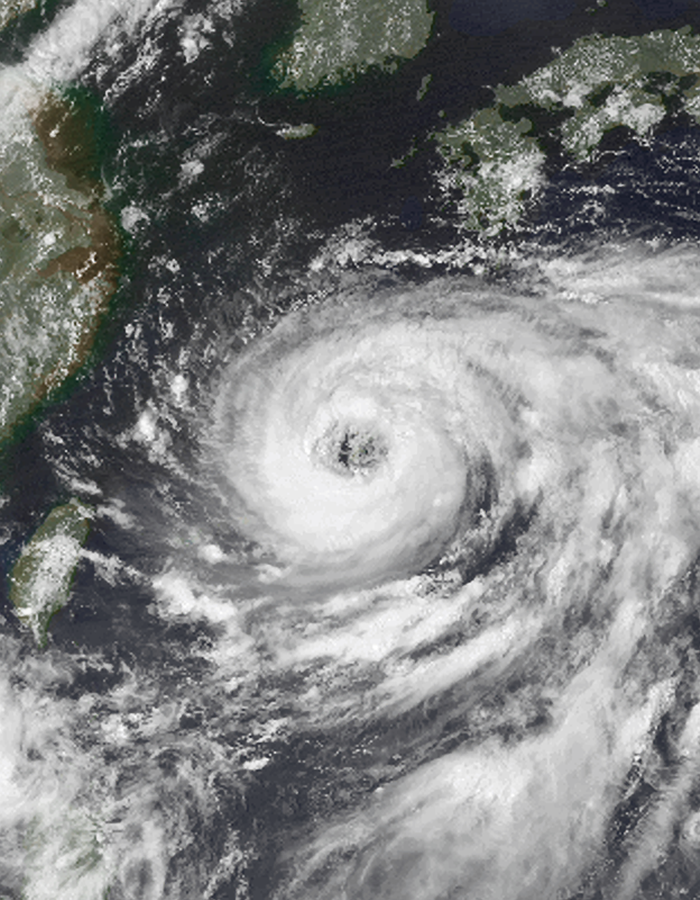
- Typhoon Kirk on August 12

Meteorological history
- Formed: August 3, 1996
- Dissipated: August 15, 1996

Typhoon
- 10-minute sustained (JMA)
- Highest winds: 140 km/h (85 mph)
- Lowest pressure: 955 hPa (mbar); 28.20 inHg

Category 2-equivalent typhoon
- 1-minute sustained (SSHWS/JTWC)
- Highest winds: 175 km/h (110 mph)
- Lowest pressure: 949 hPa (mbar); 28.02 inHg

Overall effects
- Fatalities: 5
- Injuries: 85
- Damage: $189 million (1996 USD)
- Areas affected: Japan
- Part of the 1996 Pacific typhoon season

Typhoon Kirk, known as Isang in the Philippines, was a strong tropical cyclone that affected Japan. The 13th tropical depression, 11th named storm and 6th typhoon of the 1996 Pacific typhoon season. Kirk formed at the end of the monsoon trough during late July. Kirk upgraded to a tropical storm on August 5. On August 10, the JMA upgraded Kirk to a typhoon. The storm made landfall in Kumamoto City at 10 am on August 14. Kirk downgraded to a tropical storm on August 15. Kirk became an extratropical cyclone on August 16. Kirk had an anticyclonic loop and an extremely large eye. In total, Kirk made three landfalls in Japan. It was the second typhoon to make landfall in mainland Japan in 1996.

In Japan, five people were killed, 85 people were injured. Total damage was estimated at US$189 million (¥20.6 billion). A peak rainfall total of 545.0 mm (21.46 in) occurred at Ebino, Miyazaki. 28 people were injured in Kagoshima Prefecture. Two people were killed, six people were injured. 31 flights were canceled in Ehime Prefecture. In Fukuoka Prefecture, eight people were injured.

== Meteorological history ==
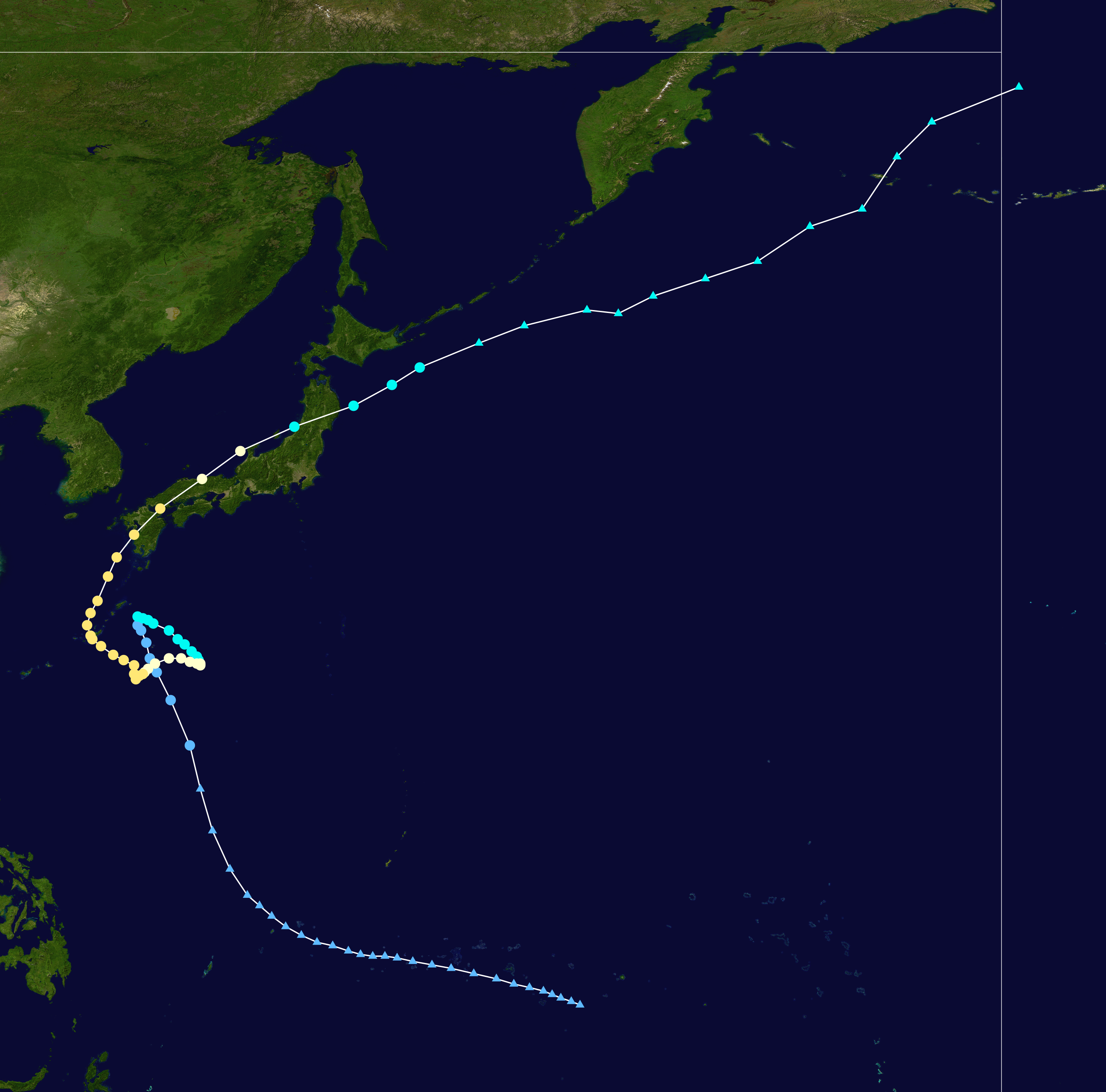
Map plotting the storm's track and intensity, according to the Saffir–Simpson scale Map key Saffir–Simpson scale Tropical depression (≤38 mph, ≤62 km/h) Tropical storm (39–73 mph, 63–118 km/h) Category 1 (74–95 mph, 119–153 km/h) Category 2 (96–110 mph, 154–177 km/h) Category 3 (111–129 mph, 178–208 km/h) Category 4 (130–156 mph, 209–251 km/h) Category 5 (≥157 mph, ≥252 km/h) Unknown Storm type Tropical cyclone Subtropical cyclone Extratropical cyclone, remnant low, tropical disturbance, or monsoon depression

During late July, a tropical disturbance formed at the end of the monsoon trough while Typhoon Herb and Tropical Storm Joy were still active. On July 29, the JTWC issued its Tropical Cyclone Formation Alert (TCFA). At 18:00 UTC on August 3, the Japan Meteorological Agency (JMA) began monitoring the system as a tropical depression. At 18:00 UTC on the same day, the JTWC issued the warning on Tropical Depression 13W. At 12:00 UTC on August 5, the JTWC upgraded Kirk to a tropical storm. At 18:00 UTC on August 5, the JMA upgraded Kirk to a tropical storm. On August 6, Kirk turned to the southeast and started an anticyclonic loop in its path.

At 00:00 UTC on August 9, the JMA upgraded Kirk to a severe tropical storm. At 06:00 UTC on August 10, the JMA upgraded Kirk to a typhoon. Prior to reaching Okinawa on August 12, Kirk developed an extremely large eye. At 06:00 UTC on August 12, the JTWC estimated an unofficial peak intensity with 1-minute sustained winds of 175 km/h (110 mph). At 09:00 UTC on August 13, the JMA estimated a minimum pressure of 955 hPa (28.2 inHg). Kirk made landfall in Kumamoto City at 10 am on August 14. Kirk passed over northern Kyushu and made its second landfall in Tokuyama at 3 pm on August 14. At 09:00 UTC on August 14, the JMA downgraded Kirk to a severe tropical storm. At 21:00 UTC on August 14, the JTWC downgraded Kirk to a tropical storm. At 09:00 UTC on August 15, the JMA downgraded Kirk to a tropical storm. At 00:00 UTC on August 16, the JMA declared as extratropical cyclone for the system. On August 16, the JTWC declared as extratropical cyclone and issued the final warning for the system. At 18:00 UTC on August 18, the JMA ceased tracking the system.

== Impact ==
Nationwide, five people were killed, 85 people were injured, 2,989 homes were destroyed, and 1,675 homes were flooded. Total damage was estimated at US$189 million (¥20.6 billion). (Note: Money values converted via Pacific Exchange Rate Service with an exchange rate for 1996) A peak rainfall total of 545.0 mm (21.46 in) occurred at Ebino, Miyazaki, including 396.0 mm (15.59 in) over a 24-hour period. A peak wind speed of 130 km/h (81 mph) was recorded in Kagoshima. More than 100,000 homes were affected by power outages. More than 600 flights were canceled.

In Kagoshima Prefecture, 28 people were injured. 286 homes were flooded. nine houses were completely destroyed. Damage was estimated at ¥2.8 billion. eight landslides were reported. 139 boats were damaged. 6 ships were damaged. In Osaka Prefecture, five people were injured, Damage was estimated at ¥9.5 million. 143 flights were canceled. In Kumamoto Prefecture, three people were injured. 25 flights were cancelled. A total of 4,523 ha (11,180 acres) of agricultural land were damaged. In Ehime Prefecture, two people were reported dead. six people were injured, including two people in Hojo City. 47 roads were damaged. 31 flights were canceled. 55,000 people were affected by power outages. In Nagasaki Prefecture, two people were injured. 12 buildings were damaged. In Okinawa Prefecture, 331 flights were cancelled. Agricultural damage was estimated at ¥790 million in Okinawa Island. The Rainbow Melody foundered south of Okinawa, Japan on August 11. In Tokushima Prefecture, one person was killed. two people were injured, six landslides occurred.

In Oita Prefecture, two people were injured. two landslides occurred. Agricultural damage was estimated at ¥1.14 billion. The Oita Expressway was closed. In Saga Prefecture, two people were injured. In Fukuoka Prefecture, eight people were injured. one landslide was reported. 50 buildings were flooded. Damage was estimated at ¥1.6 billion. 65,000 people were left without power. In Hyogo Prefecture, nine people were reported injured. Northern Hyogo Prefecture was placed under a storm warning at 12:30 PM on August 14. In Aichi Prefecture, two people were injured, including one person in Atsuta-ku, Nagoya. 31 flights were canceled. In Yamaguchi Prefecture, a 44-year-old person was killed. one person was injured. two landslides were reported. In Ishikawa Prefecture, one person was injured. one landslide occurred. Damage to agriculture was estimated at ¥36 million. In Shimane Prefecture, 12 flights were canceled, including 8 flights at Izumo Airport and 4 flights at Iwami Airport. 54 trains were canceled. Damage was estimated at ¥11.6 million. In Miyagi Prefecture, one landslide was reported. 27 flights were canceled. In Wakayama Prefecture, one landslide occurred. Damage was estimated at ¥270 million. In Nara Prefecture, one landslide was reported in Tenkawa. In Hiroshima Prefecture, two landslides were reported. 23 roads were damaged. In Kochi Prefecture, 156 roads were damaged. one landslide was reported. 30 flights were canceled.

Elsewhere, In South Korea, a storm warning was issued.
