= List of storms named Isobel =

The name Isobel has been used for four Tropical Cyclones in the Australian region of the South-East Indian Ocean.

- Cyclone Isobel (1974) – was no threat to land.
- Cyclone Isobel (1985) – did not affect land.
- Cyclone Isobel (1996) – did not pass close to any land.
- Tropical Low Isobel (2007) – made landfall along the north-west coast of Western Australia; its remnants merged with a deep low-pressure system and pummeled the region with torrential rains and high winds.

== See also ==
- List of storms named Isabel – a similar name which was used twice in the Atlantic Ocean and once in the South-West Indian Ocean.
