= Typhoon Ida (1966) =

Pacific typhoon in 1966

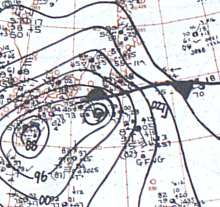
- Surface analysis of Typhoon Ida on September 24

Meteorological history
- Formed: September 22, 1966
- Extratropical: September 25, 1966
- Dissipated: September 26, 1966

Unknown-strength storm
- 10-minute sustained (JMA)
- Lowest pressure: 960 hPa (mbar); 28.35 inHg

Category 3-equivalent typhoon
- 1-minute sustained (SSHWS/JTWC)
- Highest winds: 185 km/h (115 mph)
- Lowest pressure: 961 hPa (mbar); 28.38 inHg

Overall effects
- Fatalities: 275–318 total
- Damage: Unknown
- Areas affected: Japan
- IBTrACS
- Part of the 1966 Pacific typhoon season

Typhoon Ida was a deadly typhoon that struck Japan in late-September 1966. The twenty-sixth tropical storm, the twenty-third named tropical disturbance and the fifteenth typhoon of the 1966 Pacific typhoon season, Ida originated from a tropical wave east of the Mariana Islands on September 21, which became a tropical depression the following day.

== Meteorological history ==
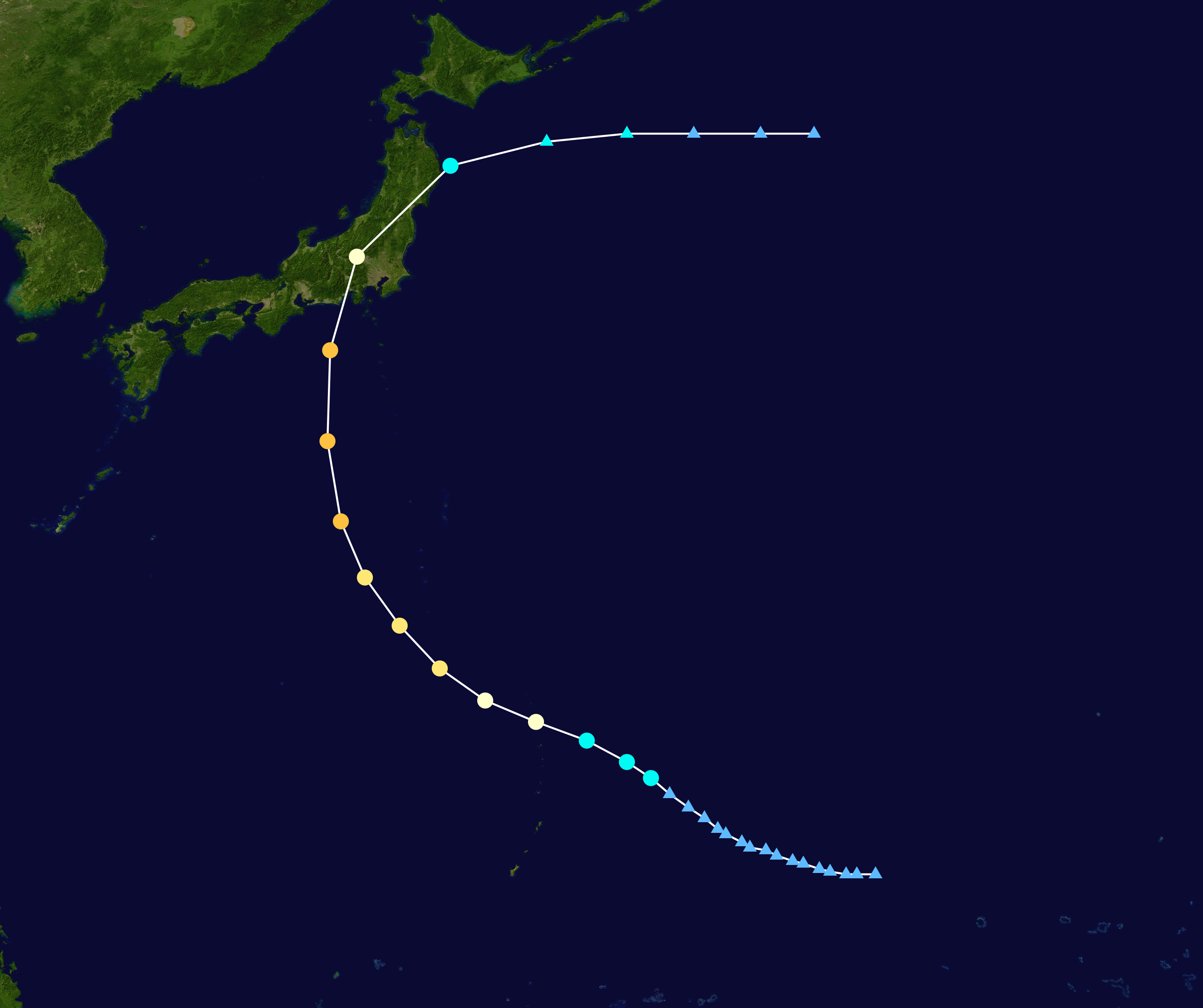
Map plotting the storm's track and intensity, according to the Saffir–Simpson scale Map key Saffir–Simpson scale Tropical depression (≤38 mph, ≤62 km/h) Tropical storm (39–73 mph, 63–118 km/h) Category 1 (74–95 mph, 119–153 km/h) Category 2 (96–110 mph, 154–177 km/h) Category 3 (111–129 mph, 178–208 km/h) Category 4 (130–156 mph, 209–251 km/h) Category 5 (≥157 mph, ≥252 km/h) Unknown Storm type Tropical cyclone Subtropical cyclone Extratropical cyclone, remnant low, tropical disturbance, or monsoon depression

A disturbance was seen to the east of the Mariana Islands on September 21 by the TIROS imagery. A reconnaissance aircraft was then deployed to investigate the area; the next day the system was upgraded to a tropical depression, which was then located 1,900 km (1,200 mi) southwest of Tokyo, Japan. The depression then intensified into a tropical storm and was given the name Ida by the Joint Typhoon Warning Center. As it moved northwestward, a rapid intensification phase occurred, and by September 23, Ida reached typhoon intensity as a 50 to 55 km (30 to 35 mi) elliptical eye was reported by reconnaissance aircraft. Ida then moved northward on September 24, and its winds peaked at 185 km/h (115 mph), making it a Category 3–equivalent typhoon on the Saffir–Simpson scale. The Japan Meteorological Agency estimated Ida's lowest pressure at 960 mb (hPa; 28.35 inHg); however, the aircraft that investigated the storm a pressure of 961 mbar (hPa; 28.38 inHg), one millibar higher than JMA's. Typhoon Ida then made landfall near Omaezaki, Shizuoka at 15:00 UTC at peak intensity. Maximum wind gusts at the top of Mount Fuji reached 324 km/h (201 mph) during the storm's passage, a proof of the typhoon's power. Ida then weakened over land as its structure deteriorated, and less than 12 hours after striking Japan, it exited into the Pacific Ocean near Tohoku as a 95 km/h (60 mph) tropical storm. It then transitioned into an extratropical cyclone, and ultimately dissipated several hundred kilometers east of Japan on September 26.

== Impact ==
Following Tropical Storm Helen in quick succession, Ida wrought tremendous damage across eastern Japan and was regarded as the worst to strike the nation since Typhoon Vera in 1959. The greatest loss of life occurred along the slopes of Mt. Fuji where two villages were virtually wiped out by massive mudslides. Nearly 700 landslides struck the region and were blamed for the majority of damage and loss of life. A total of 275 people perished, 43 were listed as missing, and a further 976 sustained injury. Disastrous landslides and strong winds destroyed more than 73,000 homes and damaged 56,000 more. Damage in the country exceeded $300 million, with crop losses being particularly heavy. The high winds also caused havoc among seagoing vessels, with 107 ships sinking. The 7,702 ton cargo liner, City of Wellington was grounded near Yokohama. A 10,208 ton freighter, Ever Sureness, was stranded at the mouth of the Tsurumi River. Additionally, the 24,829 ton Liberian tanker, Golar Jeanne-Marie, ran ashore near Shimizu.

== See also ==
- Other storms of the same name
  - Typhoon Ida (1945) – a deadly typhoon which also bore the same name and struck Japan.
  - Typhoon Ida (1958) – another deadly typhoon named Ida, which became one of the most intense tropical cyclones ever recorded; also struck Japan.
