= List of storms named Ivy =

The name Ivy has been used for a total of 16 tropical cyclones worldwide. Eleven were in the West Pacific Ocean, two in the South-West Indian Ocean, one in the Australian region, and two in the South Pacific Ocean.

In the West Pacific:

- Tropical Storm Ivy (1952) (T5207)
- Typhoon Ivy (1956) (T5617)
- Tropical Depression Ivy (1960) (01W) – Japan Meteorological Agency analyzed it as a tropical depression, not as a tropical storm.
- Typhoon Ivy (1962) (T6226, 76W)
- Typhoon Ivy (1965) (T6514, 18W, Pining)
- Tropical Storm Ivy (1967) (T6739, 41W)
- Tropical Storm Ivy (1971) (T7113, 13W) – struck Japan.
- Typhoon Ivy (1974) (T7410, 12W, Iliang) – struck Luzon and southeastern China.
- Typhoon Ivy (1977) (T7717, 17W)
- Typhoon Ivy (1991) (T9115, 17W) – approached Japan (ja).
- Typhoon Ivy (1994) (T9419, 22W)

In the South-West Indian:

- Cyclone Ivy (1966)
- Cyclone Ivy (1994)

In the Australian region:

- Cyclone Ivy (1972)

In the South Pacific:

- Cyclone Ivy (1989)
- Cyclone Ivy (2004) – caused extensive damage in Vanuatu.
