= Tropical Storm Polly (1992) =

Pacific tropical storm in 1992

Tropical Storm Polly (Isang)
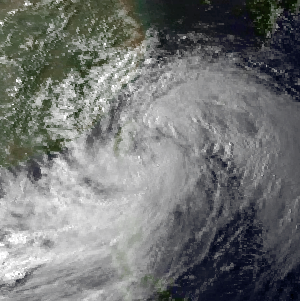
- Polly on August 29

Meteorological history
- Formed: August 27, 1992
- Dissipated: September 1, 1992

Severe tropical storm
- 10-minute sustained (JMA)
- Highest winds: 100 km/h (65 mph)
- Lowest pressure: 975 hPa (mbar); 28.79 inHg

Tropical storm
- 1-minute sustained (SSHWS/JTWC)
- Highest winds: 95 km/h (60 mph)
- Lowest pressure: 987 hPa (mbar); 29.15 inHg

Overall effects
- Fatalities: 228
- Damage: $1.3 billion (1992 USD)
- Areas affected: China, Taiwan, Japan, Philippines
- Part of the 1992 Pacific typhoon season

Tropical Storm Polly, known as Isang in the Philippines, was a strong and deadly tropical cyclone that affected China, Taiwan and Japan. Polly originated as a tropical disturbance west of Rota on August 23, 1992. The JTWC issued the first warning on Tropical Depression 16W on August 24. Polly upgraded to a tropical storm status on August 27. On August 29, the JMA reported that Polly attained a minimum pressure of 975 hPa (28.8 inHg). It was the costliest and deadliest tropical storm in the 1992 Pacific typhoon season. (Note: Polly was the costliest and deadliest tropical storm in 1992 Pacific typhoon season. Gary was the second costliest and deadliest tropical storm in 1992 Pacific typhoon season, according to Destructive Typhoons 1970-2003, 中國氣象災害大典, and Royal Observatory.) It made landfall in Fujian as a tropical depression on August 31, killing 220 people in China.

In the Philippines, the storm affected Luzon, where mudflows killed nine people. In China, it caused a severe storm surge, killing 157 people in Zhejiang and 31 in Shandong, while damage was estimated at $1.3 billion. In Japan, no injuries and deaths were reported, although the storm caused six landslides on Yonaguni Island. In Taiwan, eight people were killed.

== Meteorological history ==
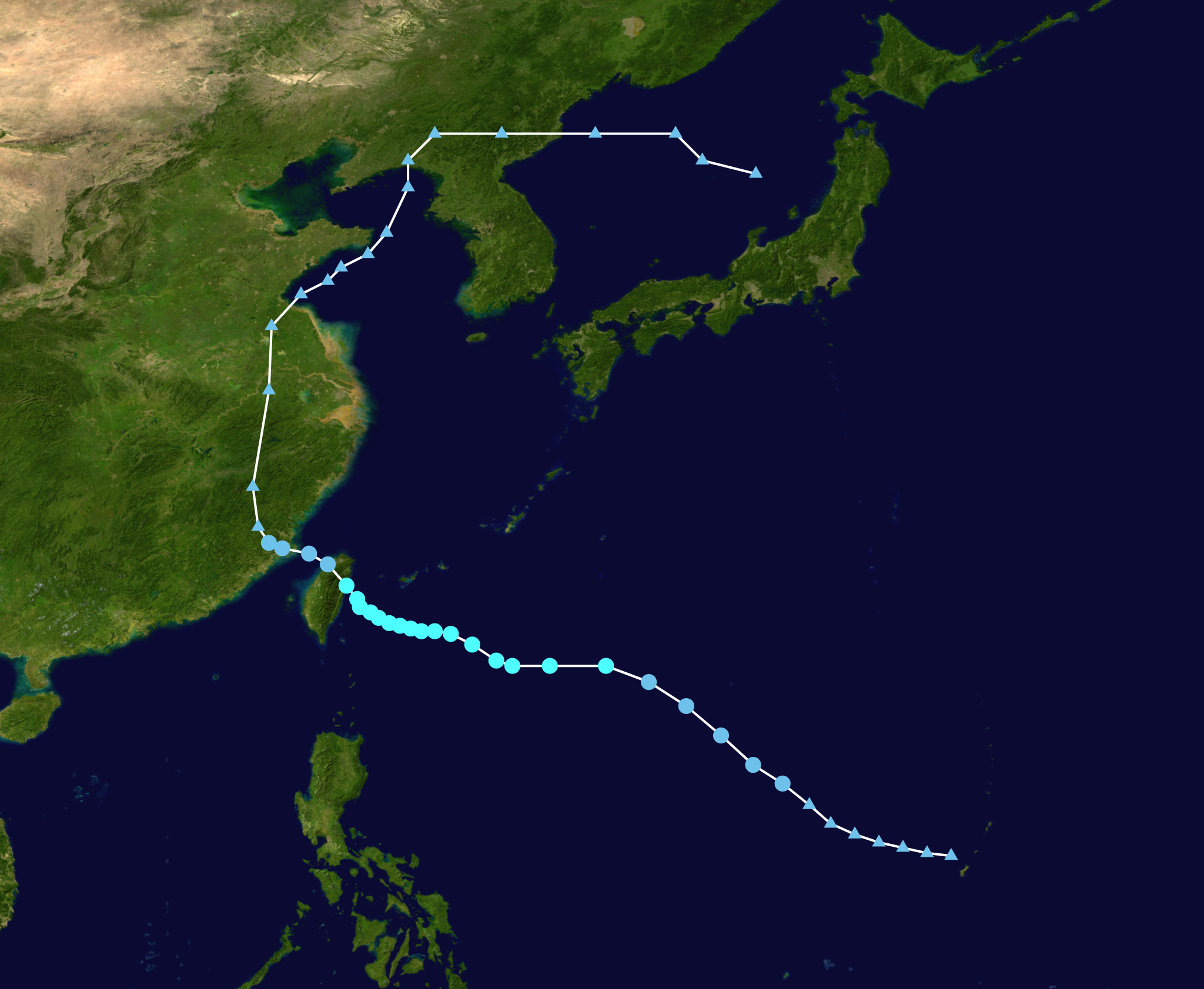
Map plotting the storm's track and intensity, according to the Saffir–Simpson scale Map key Saffir–Simpson scale Tropical depression (≤38 mph, ≤62 km/h) Tropical storm (39–73 mph, 63–118 km/h) Category 1 (74–95 mph, 119–153 km/h) Category 2 (96–110 mph, 154–177 km/h) Category 3 (111–129 mph, 178–208 km/h) Category 4 (130–156 mph, 209–251 km/h) Category 5 (≥157 mph, ≥252 km/h) Unknown Storm type Tropical cyclone Subtropical cyclone Extratropical cyclone, remnant low, tropical disturbance, or monsoon depression

At 12:00 UTC on August 23, the Joint Typhoon Warning Center (JTWC) first monitored a tropical disturbance west of Rota. The JTWC issued its Tropical Cyclone Formation Alert at 19:00 UTC on August 24. At 12:00 UTC on August 25, the JTWC issued the warning on Tropical Depression 16W. After entering the Philippine Area of Responsibility on August 26, the Philippine Atmospheric, Geophysical and Astronomical Services Administration assigned it the local name Isang.

The JTWC upgraded Polly to a tropical storm status at 12:00 UTC on August 26. On August 27, the Japan Meteorological Agency (JMA) classified the system as a tropical depression. At 18:00 UTC on August 27, the JMA upgraded Polly to a tropical storm. At 03:00 UTC on August 29, the JMA upgraded Polly to a severe tropical storm. At 06:00 UTC, the storm unofficially reached its peak intensity with 1-minute sustained winds of 60 mph (95 km/h). At 21:00 UTC on the same day, the JMA estimated a minimum pressure of 975 hPa (28.8 inHg). At 06:00 UTC on August 30, Polly made its first landfall in Hualien County as a tropical storm. At 12:00 UTC on the same day, the JTWC downgraded Polly to a tropical depression and issued the final warning for the system. Polly made landfall in Fujian on August 31 at 0:00 UTC. At 06:00 UTC on August 31, the JMA downgraded Polly to a tropical storm. At 12:00 UTC on September 4, the JMA ceased tracking the system.

== Preparations and impact ==
=== China ===
Damage was reported across Fujian, Zhejiang, Jiangsu, Shandong, Hebei, Tianjin, and Liaoning, with total losses estimated at $1.3 billion. In Yueqing, rainfall at the Yandun station reached 741 mm (29.2 in), including 406 mm (16.0 in) in 24 hours and 271 mm (10.7 in) in 12 hours. In Fujian, a storm surge reached 10.96 m (36.0 ft) at Fushan Pier, surpassing the historically recorded high-tide level, the storm killed 12 people and destroyed 28,800 dwellings; 5,335 ha (13,180 acres) of aquaculture, and 200 sluices and bridges, another 90,000 homes were damaged, monetary damage was estimated at ¥950 million.

In Zhejiang, 157 people were killed and 535 were injured. The storm damaged 142,000 homes; 42 pumping stations; 605 km (376 mi) of embankments; 51 small-sized hydropower stations; 333 km (207 mi) of river banks; 763 km (474 mi) of roads; 480 bridges; 1,184 dams; 5,775 km (3,588 mi) of power lines; 95 sluices, and 735 km (457 mi) of communication lines, a further 1,860 boats were damaged or destroyed, and total damage was estimated at $636 million (¥3.5 billion).

In Jiangsu, 14 people were killed and 25 were injured, floodwaters inundated 657,000 ha (1,620,000 acres) of crops, while 21,000 dwellings collapsed and another 52,000 were damaged. In Shandong, 31 deaths were reported due to the remnants of Polly, which destroyed 20 piers; 16,000 homes; 200 km (120 mi) of power lines, and 405 utility poles, two scenic spots were also damaged, shrimp ponds covering 13,900 ha (34,000 acres) and fruit trees covering 52,200 ha (129,000 acres) were affected, while 97,550 trees were toppled, and damage was estimated at ¥2.5 billion. In Hebei, a storm tide of 5.6 m (18 ft) was recorded, flooding affected 80,000 ha (200,000 acres) of agricultural and aquaculture land, including 30,000 ha (74,000 acres) of shrimp ponds and 50,000 ha (120,000 acres) of rice fields. Monetary damage was estimated at ¥115 million.

In Tianjin, 100 culvert gates, three pumping stations, three docks, and 30 boats were damaged, floodwaters also inundated 200 ha (490 acres) of oil fields in Dagang, damage was estimated at ¥450 million. In Liaoning, six people were killed, the storm damaged 104 boats and 480 km (300 mi) of roads were damaged. About 6.18 million trees were destroyed, while 71,600 ha (177,000 acres) of agricultural land were flooded or destroyed. Damage was estimated at ¥30 million.

=== Elsewhere ===
In the Philippines, the storm killed nine people and damaged two dikes, while 7,000 homes were buried by mudflows. Rainfall at Mount Pinatubo peaked at 137.6 mm (5.42 in). In Taiwan, eight people were killed, including a 66-year-old woman and a 78-year-old woman, while three people were injured; damage was estimated at $72.6 million. In Okinawa Prefecture, one port collapsed, while six landslides and two damaged roads were reported across Okinawa Island and Kurme Island. Damage to sugarcane farms on Yonaguni Island was estimated at $21,318 (¥2.7 million). (Note: Money values converted via Pacific Exchange Rate Service with an exchange rate for 1992)
