= List of storms named Innis =

The name Innis has been used for two tropical cyclones in the Southwestern Pacific Ocean:

- Cyclone Innis (1992), which briefly threatened Vanuatu
- Cyclone Innis (2009), a weak cyclone that crossed Vanuatu, New Caledonia, and New Zealand.
