= Tropical Storm Ivo (2019) =

Pacific tropical storm in 2019

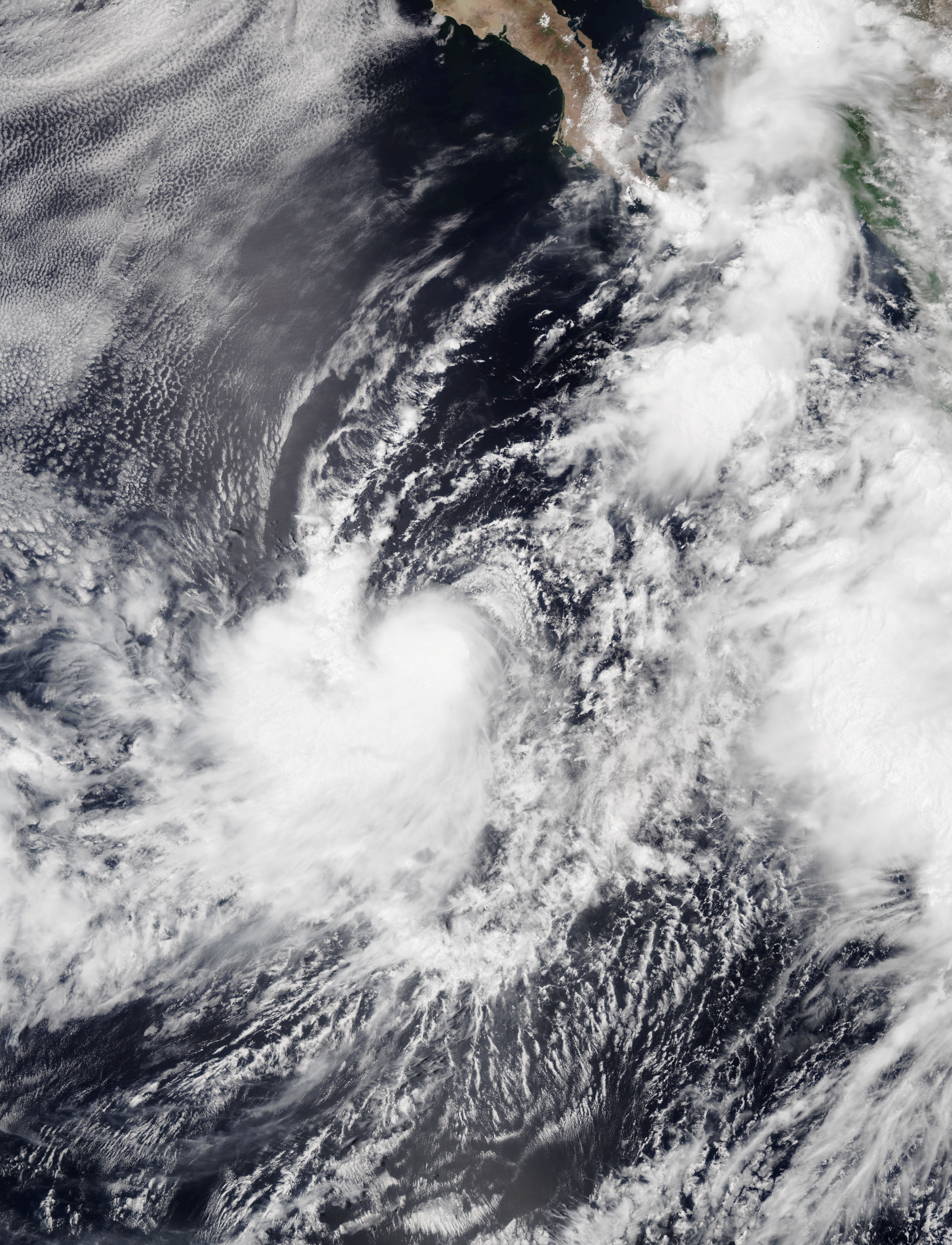
- Tropical Storm Ivo at peak intensity near Clarión Island on August 22, 2019

Meteorological history
- Formed: August 21, 2019
- Remnant low: August 25, 2019
- Dissipated: August 27, 2019

Tropical storm
- 1-minute sustained (SSHWS/NWS)
- Highest winds: 70 mph (110 km/h)
- Lowest pressure: 990 mbar (hPa); 29.23 inHg

Overall effects
- Fatalities: 5 total
- Damage: Unknown
- Areas affected: Mexico
- IBTrACS /
- Part of the 2019 Pacific hurricane season

Tropical Storm Ivo was a tropical cyclone that brought heavy rainfall to five states in Mexico, causing severe flooding in August 2019. The tenth tropical cyclone and ninth named storm of the 2019 Pacific hurricane season, Ivo arose from a low-pressure area that spawned south of Guatemala on August 16. The low-pressure system gradually organized over the next several days as it tracked west-northwestward. The system coalesced into a tropical depression early on August 21 and strengthened into Tropical Storm Ivo several hours later. Located within a favorable environment of moist air and warm sea surface temperatures, the cyclone quickly intensified, peaking the next day with 1-minute maximum sustained winds of 70 mph (110 km/h) and a pressure of 990 mbar (29.23 inHg). Increasing wind shear caused the storm's intensification to level off later that day, as the system turned towards the north-northwest. Ivo passed by Clarion Island midday on August 23, generating winds of 60 mph (100 km/h) on the island. Wind shear caused Ivo to significantly degrade in structure and intensity during the next couple of days. Cold sea surface temperatures, as well as dry and stable air, caused the cyclone to degenerate into a remnant low early on August 25. The low meandered over the eastern Pacific before opening up into a trough of low pressure early on August 27.

Ivo prompted the issuance of blue alerts for multiple municipalities in Sinaloa and Sonora, signifying minimal danger. The Marine plan was activated in several states to prepare for heavy rainfall and flooding. Schools were canceled across over a dozen Sinaloan municipalities and at the Autonomous University of Sinaloa. Severe rainfall and flooding occurred, mostly across Baja California Sur and Sinaloa, forcing the evacuation of hundreds of people. Over a hundred shelters were established for victims of the storm. Hundreds of homes and streets were inundated by floodwaters and mud, as a result of torrential rainfall and multiple rivers overflowing. The rainfall worsened damage to infrastructure, roads, and bridges, which had been damaged during Hurricane Willa in 2018. At least 5 people were killed in Nayarit after being swept away by the El Cangrejo river. Heavy rainfall and hail occurred in Zacatecas, flooding two dozen businesses and homes and stranding nearly a dozen vehicles. Three landslides occurred in Mexico State, blocking streets and damaging houses. Three rivers spilled their banks, flooding several neighborhoods in the Mexico City suburbs. In the aftermath of the storm, Plan DN-III-E, a disaster relief and rescue plan, was activated in five states. Military troops assisted with rescue and cleanup operations in multiple states. Collection sites were opened to receive food and supplies for victims of the storm.

== Meteorological history ==
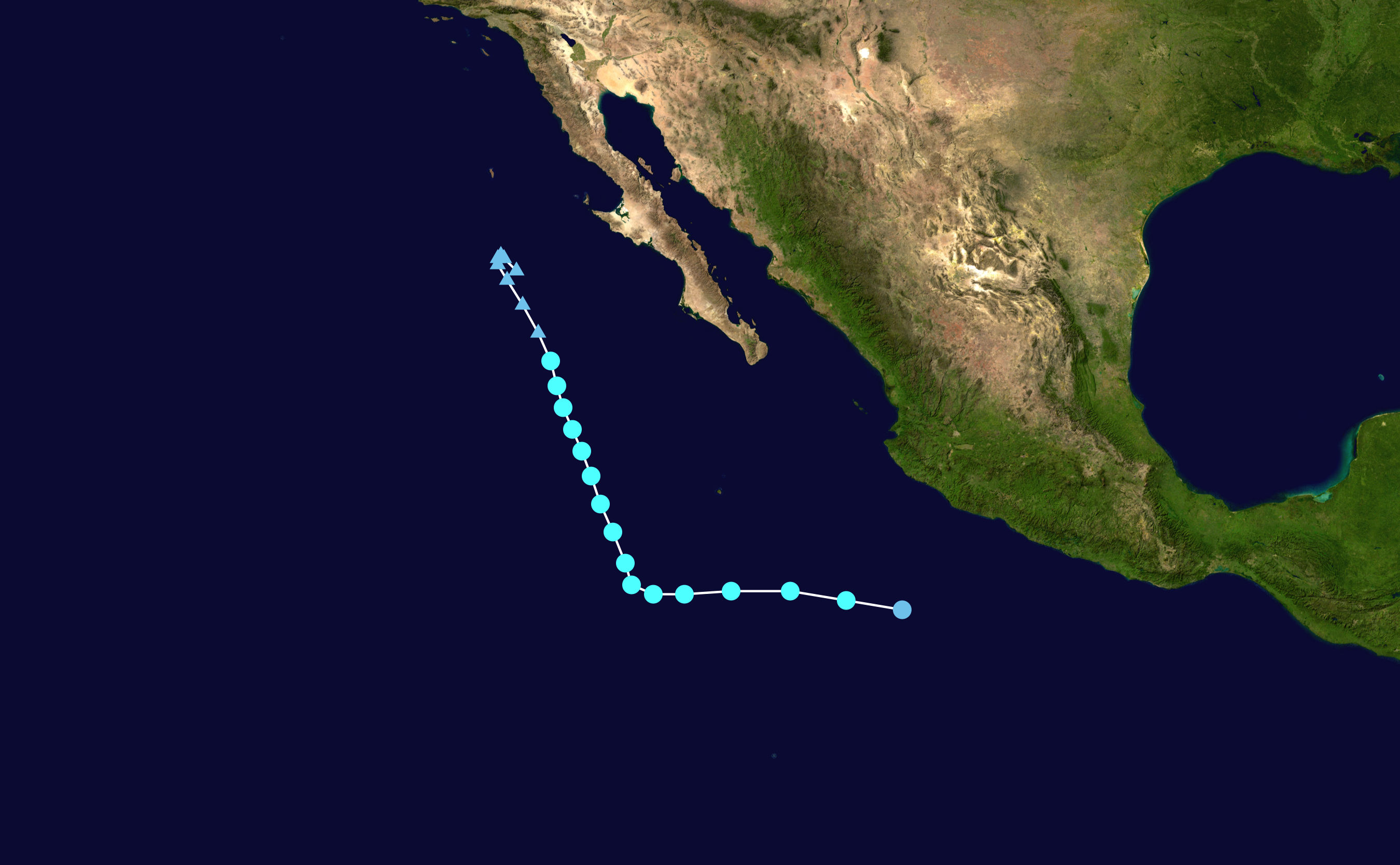
Map plotting the storm's track and intensity, according to the Saffir–Simpson scale Map key Saffir–Simpson scale Tropical depression (≤38 mph, ≤62 km/h) Tropical storm (39–73 mph, 63–118 km/h) Category 1 (74–95 mph, 119–153 km/h) Category 2 (96–110 mph, 154–177 km/h) Category 3 (111–129 mph, 178–208 km/h) Category 4 (130–156 mph, 209–251 km/h) Category 5 (≥157 mph, ≥252 km/h) Unknown Storm type Tropical cyclone Subtropical cyclone Extratropical cyclone, remnant low, tropical disturbance, or monsoon depression

A tropical wave exited the west coast of Africa on August 4, while a second wave reached the eastern tropical Atlantic Ocean a few days after. The waves tracked westward and entered the eastern Pacific Ocean, starting on August 14. The National Hurricane Center first forecast on August 13 that a low-pressure area would form southeast of Mexico's southeastern coast later in that week. A low-pressure area spawned south of Guatemala early on August 16 from the first wave. This wave proceeded westward while the low-pressure area tracked towards the west-northwest. Thunderstorm activity associated with the latter system significantly increased during the next two days. By August 19, the system was located approximately 230 mi (370 km) south of Mexico's southeastern coast. The second tropical wave tracked through the region during this time, sparking a further increase in convective activity. The low-pressure system became more organized on August 21, with wind data from satellites showing an improved circulation. A tropical depression developed 290 miles (465 km) south of Manzanillo, Mexico, at 06:00 UTC, and further strengthened into Tropical Storm Ivo six hours later.

The nascent tropical storm was located in a favorable environment, with warm sea surface temperatures of 86 °F (30 °C), moist air, and moderate northeasterly vertical wind shear. At the time, Ivo possessed a curved rainband spiraling into its low-level center. Meanwhile, a mid-level ridge located to the north was causing the cyclone to track towards the west-northwest. Ivo continued to strengthen over the next day, with the cyclone's cloud pattern improving and a mid-level, banded eye developing underneath its central dense overcast. Ivo peaked at 12:00 UTC on August 22, with maximum sustained winds of 70 mph (120 km/h) and a minimum central pressure of 990 mbar (29.23 inHg). Shortly after peaking, Ivo's forward crawl slowed down to 12 mph (19 km/h), about half the speed it was travelling at one day prior, as the western edge of the ridge weakened. The cyclone's intensification came to a halt as northeasterly wind shear increased. Convection was largely concentrated in the southern half of the storm, and the low-level center was partially exposed along the northeastern edge of the cloud cover.

Ivo quickly turned towards the northwest and later the north-northwest early on August 23, as it rounded the western edge of the mid-level ridge. Wind shear continued to batter the cyclone, causing the latter's low-level center to separate from the central dense overcast. Ivo passed just offshore Clarion Island around 12:00 UTC on August 23, producing sustained winds of 60 mph (100 km/h) on the island. Afterwards, Ivo's low-level center became separated from the convection as the cyclone decayed. Continuous wind shear bombarded Ivo, causing the mid-level circulation to separate and leaving only a small area of convection near the center. Cold 75 °F (24 °C) sea surface temperatures below and dry and stable air aloft caused all remaining convection to dissipate, with Ivo becoming a 35 mph (65 km/h) remnant low-pressure system around 06:00 UTC on August 25, located 445 mi (715 km) west of the southern tip of the Baja California peninsula. The low continued to track northwestward to north-northwestward while slowing down and weakening. The low became stationary on August 26 and turned towards the southeast, under the influence of a low-level steering flow, which was located west of the Baja California peninsula. The low opened up into a trough of low-pressure around 00:00 UTC on August 27.

== Preparations and impact ==
A blue alert, signifying minimal danger, was issued for the Sinaloan municipalities of Guaymas, Empalme, Cajeme, Navojoa, Huatabampo, Etchojóa, Álamos, Benito Juárez, San Ignacio Rio Muerto, Bácum, Quiriego, and Rosario. A blue alert was also issued for the Sonoran municipalities of Guaymas, Empalme, Cajeme, Navojoa, Huatabampo, Etchojóa, Álamos, Benito Juárez, San Ignacio Rio Muerto, Bácum, Quiriego, and Rosario Tesopaco. In Baja California Sur, 6 shelters were erected in Cabo San Lucas and another 6 in San José del Cabo. The Marine Plan was activated in the states of Baja California Sur, Sonora, Sinaloa, Nayarit, Jalisco, Colima, Michoacán, Guerrero, Oaxaca, and Chiapas. Classes were canceled in 18 Sinaloan municipalities, and the Autonomous University of Sinaloa was closed. In El Carrizo, people living on a road parallelling the International Highway evacuated from their residences due to the threat of heavy rainfall and severe flooding, not wanting to experience a repeat of Tropical Depression Nineteen-E, which affected the region one year prior.

Ivo caused severe flooding across multiple Mexican states, including Sinaloa, Baja California Sur, Nayarit, Zacatecas, and Mexico State. Two emergency shelters were opened in Ciudad Insurgentes, Baja California Sur, during the storm as a result of flooding. Homes were flooded in Comondú, and people were rescued by boats. Minimal damage was inflicted to roadways in Los Cabos. Multiple landslides occurred around San José del Cabo and Cabo del Este.

Torrential rainfall from Ivo caused flooding throughout Sinaloa; the municipalities of El Rosario, Mazatlán, Elota, Mocorito, and Guasave were the most severely affected, with rainfall ranging from 70–244 mm (2.8–9.6 in) occurring there. A sinkhole formed in a section of the Mazatlán-Culiacán highway in the Elota Municipality. The hole was at least 6.1 m (20 ft) long and 0.61 m (2 ft). Another section of the highway was flooded after a canal overflowed, forcing a partial closure of the road at that point. At least 180 homes were flooded in El Rosario. Four bridges collapsed in El Rosario municipality, isolating nine rural villages. Damage to the Monte Alto and La Batanga bridges was worsened as a result of heavy rainfall during Ivo, isolating communities along one bank of the Baluarte River. Ivo worsened the damage to many roads, bridges, and other infrastructure that had previously been damaged by Hurricane Willa in 2018. One temporary shelter was established, and the state government set up health and cleaning service groups during the storm. Around 200 homes were inundated with 1 m (3.3 ft) of water in Mazatlán.

The Jabalines river spilled its banks near the edge of Mazatlán. Floodwaters and mud inundated homes in the Jacarandas and Lico Velarde neighborhoods. At least 50 people were evacuated in the El Rosario, Indeco, Jacarandas, and Villa Jaraco neighborhoods and taken to shelters. A canal overflowed in the Jacarandas neighborhood, inundating a school with 1 metre (3.3 ft) of water and mud. Furniture, technology, and records within the building were almost completely ruined. One family in the neighborhood lost everything after floodwaters and mud inundated their house. In the Lico Velarde neighborhood, heavy rainfall from Ivo worsened existing sewage problems. The Guadalupe drain overflowed in Guasave, flooding dozens of homes. Floodwaters damaged at least 200 homes in Guasave and 46 in Ahome. In Los Mochis and Ahome, sewage systems collapsed. At least fifteen neighborhoods were flooded throughout Los Mochis. The storm caused flooding up to 12.5 mm (0.49 in) deep in the city, most severe in the Las Mañanitas neighborhood. Three pumps were working to remove water from that neighborhood. Several streets and the main access road to the neighborhood were flooded. Streets were closed to traffic in the city to prevent waves, and 108 shelters were established for victims of the storm. The Juárez drain overflowed near Los Mochis after Ivo clogged its sea outlet, flooding streets and fields, the latter of which damaged 800–1,000 hectares (2,000–2,500 acres) of crops. At least five ejidos were inundated in Guasave.

The Culiacán Water Park was entirely flooded as a result of heavy rainfall during Ivo, resulting in its closure. The nearby Black Bridge was closed by authorities, and a road in the Derivadora Dam was closed before the Culiacán river overflowed. In the Hacienda Alameda subdivision, Culiacán, Ivo caused water pipes to rupture and washed away rubble from houses. At least 180 homes were inundated by floodwaters in the town of Las Brisas. In the Angostura Municipality, the towns of Chinitos and Melchor Ocampo were left isolated, after water from an irrigation channel significantly damaged the Ford bridge. A shelter was established for people who lived on the banks of the channel.

In Acaponeta, Nayarit, five people were swept away by the overflowing El Cangrejo river. The storm caused flooding and hail and in the state of Zacatecas. Floodwaters up to 1 m (3.3 ft) were reported in the downtown region of Fresnillo. Six businesses and 25 homes were inundated, and 11 cars were stranded. Torrential rainfall affected Naucalpan Municipality, Mexico State, flooding 16 homes and vehicles and streets. A landslide occurred in the San Lorenzo Totolinga neighborhood, near the Totolinga river, damaging a house and requiring the rescue of two children. At least 30 residences were flooded in Toluca. The Hondo, Chico de Los Remedios, and Los Cuartos rivers spilled their banks, causing damage in several neighborhoods. Floodwaters damaged Calle 4 in San Rafael Chamapa. The Chico de Los Remedios river spilled its banks in Ribera de Echegaray, causing floodwaters and garbage to collide with a bridge on San Agustín avenue. This in turn caused additional flooding. The September 16 ravine also overflowed in Ribera de Echegaray. The overflowing Chico de Los Remedios river inundated 12 houses in the Colon neighborhood, 10 in the Pastores neighborhood, and 8 in the El Conde neighborhood with water and mud. A landslide occurred in the Valle Dorado neighborhood, and another occurred on Rivera Street. Heavy rainfall occurred in Iztapalapa, flooding streets in the neighborhoods of Lomas de Zaragoza, Santa Martha Acatitla, Chilpancingo Sur, and Niño Artillero Popular Ermita Zaragoza. The Water System of Mexico City requested that motorists avoid the eastern side of the city due to flooding.

== Aftermath ==
As a result of flooding from heavy rainfall, emergency declarations were issued for the Sinaloan municipalities of Rosario, Mazatlán, Elota, Mocorito, and Guasave to provide access to funds for food, shelter, and medical supplies. In Guasave, pantries were erected and medical teams were dispatched to aid victims of the storm. Plan DN-III-E, a disaster relief and rescue plan, was activated for Sinaloa and Baja California, with 400 soldiers being deployed to those states, collectively. The plan was later extended to include Nayarit, Mexico State, and Mexico City. In Baja California Sur, military troops were helping to remove debris, unclog drains, direct traffic, remove mud and floodwaters from homes in Comundú, and aid trapped cars. Military vehicles helped to evacuate citizens to shelters. Two shelters were set up at schools in Comondú. At least 230 people were evacuated from their homes and taken to shelters. Emergencies were declared for the cities of Los Cabos and Comondú in Baja California Sur. Food was distributed to victims of the storm at a temporary shelter located at a school in Comondú. The Baja California Sur state government requested funds from FONDEN, a natural disaster relief fund, to help with cleanup and repair efforts in Ciudad Insurgentes.

The commencement of school for 2019 in Ciudad Insurgentes was delayed for one day, as a result of heavy rainfall. Municipal officials in Loreto, Baja California Sur, set up a collection site which stockpiled donations of medicine, blankets, clothes, diapers, canned food, powdered milk, and bottled water. At least 56 families had to leave their homes in Mazatlán as a result of torrential rainfall. Relief programs were established to support these families and small businesses that were impacted by the storm. The Ministry of Environment and Natural Resources prevented the usage of backhoes to clear off beaches in Mazatlán after strong waves from Ivo deposited algae there. The governor of Sinaloa and the mayor of Los Mochis provided MX$80 million (US$4 million) in funds for 26 separate projects in order to fix drainage problems caused by Ivo throughout Ahome municipality. Farmers in Los Mochis, Topolobampo, and Villa de Ahome worked to drain their fields to prepare for the next agricultural season, after the storm inundated the fields with up to 170 mm (6.7 in) of water.

Officials warned residents in Los Mochis not to drink tap water after Ivo damaged chlorine injectors, lowering the chlorination of the water. The Autonomous University of Baja California Sur hosted a collection site for the victims of the storm, collecting food such as canned goods, water, pasta, and beans and items such as pallas, brooms, rakes, machetes, pickers, mops, hygiene products, cleaning products, medicine, and clothing. Collection sites were also established in Ciudad Constitución and Los Cabos municipality. The Mazatlán municipal government provided citizens affected by the storm in the November 20 neighborhood with over 200 household appliances and furniture items, including mattresses and bed bases, washing machines, stoves, and refrigerators. In Choix, Sinaloa, the mayor provided 12 schools with a collective total of 84 student desks, 230 chairs, 165 armchairs, 26 teacher chairs, and 30 teacher desks.

The Water Commission of the State of Mexico sent six suction-pressure trucks, two squadrons, and six bilge pumps to clear floodwaters from homes and streets in Naucalpan. In Mexico City and Mexico State, military personnel assisted with draining water, cleaning residences, clearing debris, and assisting stranded motorists. At least 250 people and 50 vehicles worked to remove mud and garbage from roads, houses, and the San Agustín bridge in Ribera de Echegaray.

== See also ==
- List of storms named Ivo
- Weather of 2019
- Tropical cyclones in 2019
- List of Baja California Peninsula hurricanes
- Timeline of the 2019 Pacific hurricane season
