= List of storms named Isa =

The names Isa and Issa have been used for one tropical cyclone in the Western Pacific Ocean, one in the Australian region, and one subtropical cyclone in the South-West Indian Ocean.

In the West Pacific:

- Typhoon Isa (1997) (T9701, 02W) – a Category 5-equivalent super typhoon that affected Guam, Pohnpei, and Rota, causing a total of $1 million (1997 USD; $1.96 million 2024 USD) in damages.

In the Australian region:

- Cyclone Isa (1970) – a Category 1 tropical cyclone that affected the Solomon Islands and crossed into the South Pacific Ocean.

In the South-West Indian Ocean:

- Subtropical Depression Issa (2022) – exacerbated the KwaZulu-Natal floods in South Africa that killed at least 436 people.

== See also ==
Similar names that have been used for tropical cyclones and other named storms:

- List of storms named Ilsa – used in the Australian region and two other tropical cyclone basins.
- List of storms named Isang – used in the Western Pacific Ocean and South-West Indian Ocean.
- Storm Isha (2024) – a European windstorm that affected the British Isles, the Netherlands, and Scandinavia.
