= Typhoon Irving (1982) =

Pacific typhoon in 1982

Typhoon Irving (Ruping)
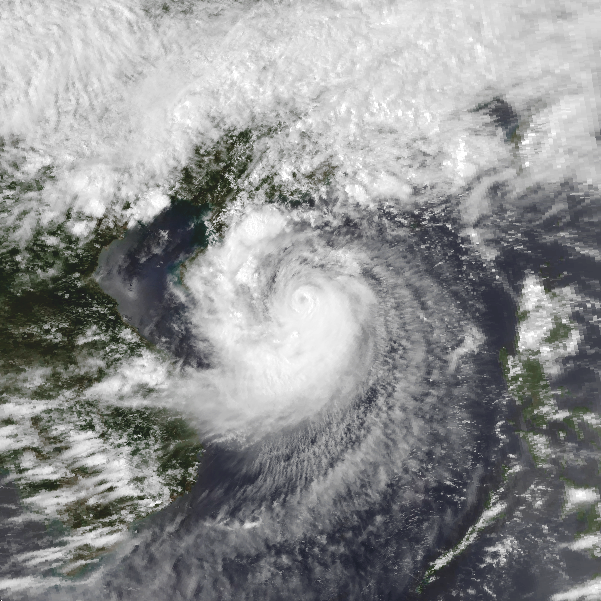
- Typhoon Irving early on September 13

Meteorological history
- Formed: September 5, 1982
- Dissipated: September 16, 1982

Very strong typhoon
- 10-minute sustained (JMA)
- Highest winds: 155 km/h (100 mph)
- Lowest pressure: 950 hPa (mbar); 28.05 inHg

Category 2-equivalent typhoon
- 1-minute sustained (SSHWS/JTWC)
- Highest winds: 165 km/h (105 mph)
- Lowest pressure: 950 hPa (mbar); 28.05 inHg

Overall effects
- Fatalities: 65 total
- Damage: $23.3 million (1982 USD)
- Areas affected: Philippines, China
- IBTrACS
- Part of the 1982 Pacific typhoon season

Typhoon Irving, known in the Philippines as Tropical Storm Ruping, was a mid-season tropical cyclone that affected the Philippines and China during September 1982. An area of disturbed weather developed within the monsoon trough during early September 1982 near Guam. Following an increase in organization, a tropical depression developed on the morning of September 5. Later that day, the depression intensified into Tropical Storm Irving. Irving tracked westward, nearly becoming a typhoon before hitting the central Philippines. There, Irving uprooted trees, downed power and telephone lines, triggered landslides, and forced the cancellation of several domestic airline flights. Irving damaged 7,890 houses in Albay and Sorsogon provinces alone, resulting in 138,500 people homeless. Nation-wide, 65 people were killed, 26 others were hurt, and 29 were rendered missing. A total of 44,383 families or 248,040 residents sought shelter. Moreover, 18,488 homes were damaged and 5,599 others were demolished. Damage in the country was assessed at US$23.3 million, including US$14.2 million in crops. While crossing the island chain, Irving turned northwestward. After entering the South China Sea, Irving continued generally northwest, and became a typhoon on September 11. After developing a well-defined eye, Irving attained its peak intensity of 160 km/h (100 mph) the following day. Land interaction with Hainan Island resulted in a weakening trend, and Irving was downgraded to a tropical storm before striking the southern coast of China on September 15. Across the Leizhou Peninsula, 90% of homes were damaged. Onshore, Irving rapidly weakened and the storm dissipated on September 16.

== Meteorological history ==
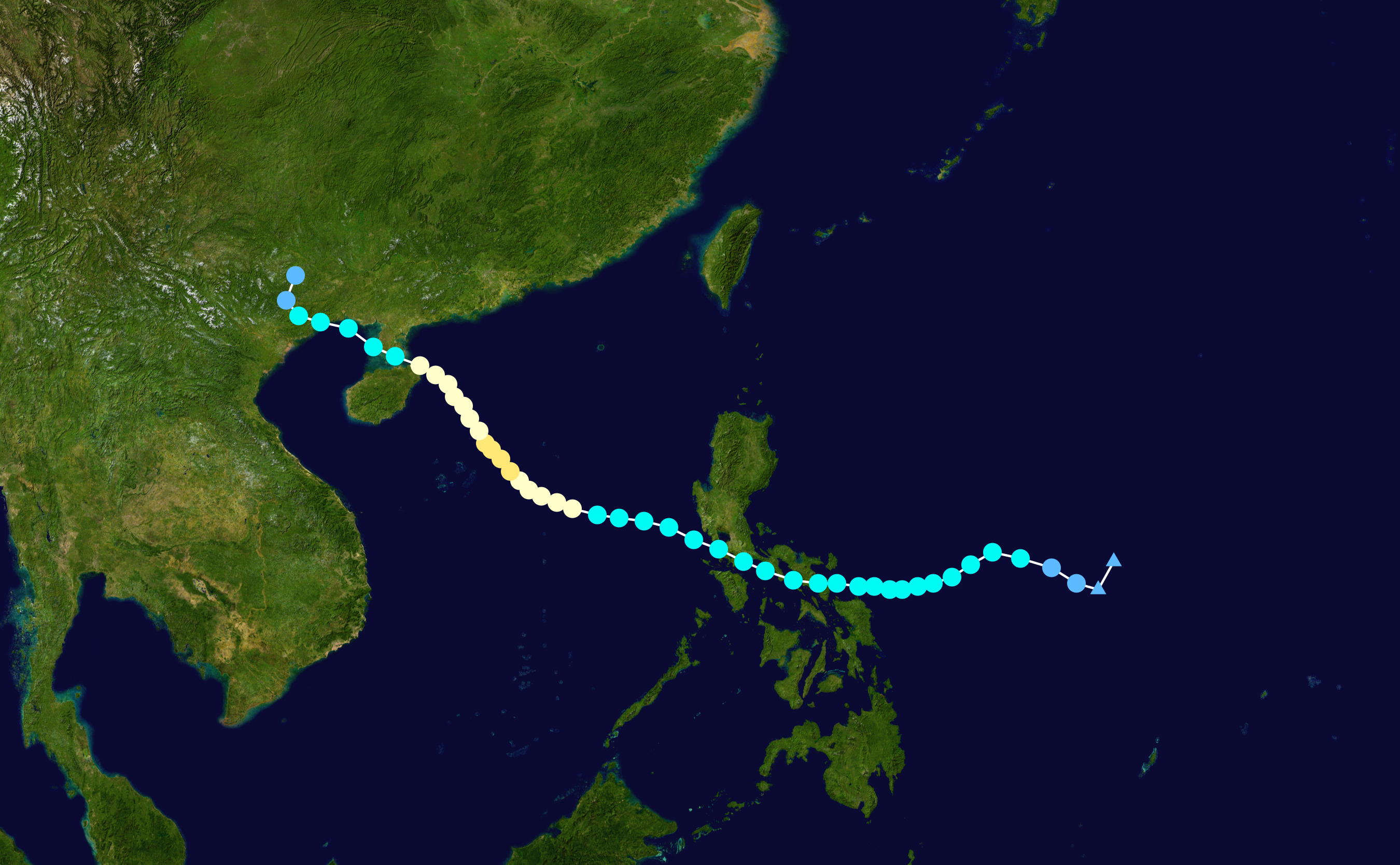
Map plotting the storm's track and intensity, according to the Saffir–Simpson scale Map key Saffir–Simpson scale Tropical depression (≤38 mph, ≤62 km/h) Tropical storm (39–73 mph, 63–118 km/h) Category 1 (74–95 mph, 119–153 km/h) Category 2 (96–110 mph, 154–177 km/h) Category 3 (111–129 mph, 178–208 km/h) Category 4 (130–156 mph, 209–251 km/h) Category 5 (≥157 mph, ≥252 km/h) Unknown Storm type Tropical cyclone Subtropical cyclone Extratropical cyclone, remnant low, tropical disturbance, or monsoon depression

Typhoon Irving originated from an area of poorly organized convection associated with an active monsoon trough anchored south of Guam in early September 1982. Surface pressures throughout the region between 125th meridian east to 135th meridian east and 8th parallel north to 13th parallel north were below 1,004 mbar (29.6 inHg), and winds were up to 40 km/h (25 mph). By the morning of September 4, a low-level circulation had become evident on visual satellite imagery, despite a decrease in deep convection. In response to a decrease in wind shear that followed the development of Typhoon Judy and passage of Typhoon Gordon east of Japan, conditions became more favorable for tropical cyclogenesis. The circulation then became more developed and an increase in cloud organization was seen on satellite imagery, prompting the issuance of a Tropical Cyclone Formation Alert early on September 5. At 06:00 UTC, the Japan Meteorological Agency (JMA) upgraded the system into a tropical depression, (Note: The Japan Meteorological Agency is the official Regional Specialized Meteorological Center for the western Pacific Ocean.) and three hours later, the Joint Typhoon Warning Center (JTWC) classified the system as Tropical Depression 18, after a Hurricane hunter aircraft closed off a surface circulation with observed winds near 55 km/h (35 mph). Based on continued convective organization, Tropical Depression 18 was upgraded to Tropical Storm Irving at 18:00 UTC on September 5 by the JTWC, (Note: Wind estimates from the JMA and most other basins throughout the world are sustained over 10 minutes, while estimates from the United States-based Joint Typhoon Warning Center are sustained over 1 minute. 1 minute winds are about 1.14 times the amount of 10 minute winds.) with the JMA following suit six hours later.

At the time of the upgrade, Irving was characterized with an exposed low-level circulation center to the east of the deep convection, where the upper-level circulation was. Through September 8, Irving tracked south of a strengthening subtropical ridge and maintained a westward track across the Philippine Sea. An eye developed on early on September 8, indicating a strengthening trend. Irving made landfall at 09:00 UTC on September 8 on the southern tip of Luzon. At the time of landfall, the JTWC estimated winds of 115 km/h (70 mph) while the JMA reported winds of 105 km/h (65 mph), making Irving a severe tropical storm. Over land, the eye quickly disappeared from satellite imagery. Thereafter, Irving assumed a more northwestward path through the Sibuyan Sea and crossed the central Philippines. Despite losing organization due to land interaction, Irving maintained much of its intensity. Irving entered the open waters of the South China Sea, 30 mi (50 km) southwest of Cubi Point Naval Air Station, at 17:00 UTC on September 9.

As Irving moved into the South China Sea, a return to a more westward track and gradual intensification were forecast by the JTWC, in part because the subtropical ridge was anticipated to remain anchored north of the system. However, this ridge proved to be weaker than expected and Irving tracked slowly northwestward instead. A Hurricane hunter aircraft at 06:30 UTC on September 12 reported maximum winds of 170 km/h (105 mph) and a peak pressure of 947 mbar (28.0 inHg), which was considerably higher than satellite intensity estimates of 95 to 120 km/h (60 to 75 mph), even though satellite images also detected a well-defined eye. Post-storm analysis by the JTWC, however, revealed that Irving attained typhoon intensity about 24 hours earlier, early on September 11. At noon on September 12, the JMA estimates that Irving attained its maximum intensity of 160 km/h (100 mph) and a minimum barometric pressure of 30 inHg (950 mbar). At the time of its peak, Typhoon Irving had a very tight circulation, with the radius of 95 km/h (60 mph) winds within 110 km (68 mi) of the center during this period of maximum intensity. On September 15, as the system began to interact with Hainan Island and the coast of China, Irving was downgraded to tropical storm strength by the JTWC and the JMA. Irving made landfall approximately 125 mi (205 km) northeast of Hanoi at 18:00 UTC. At the time of landfall, the JTWC estimated winds of 115 km/h (70 mph) while the JMA reported winds of 105 km/h (65 mph), making Irving a severe tropical storm. Irving thereafter rapidly dissipated over the mountainous area of Vietnam.

== Impact ==
Across the Philippines, Irving battered a dozen provinces in the southern section of Luzon, toppling trees and ripping off rooftops. Moreover, the storm also uprooted trees, downed power and telephone lines, triggered landslides. The storm also forced the cancellation of several domestic airline flights and prompted the closure of schools. Irving damaged 7,890 houses in the Albay and Sorsogon provinces alone, which displaced 23,101 families, or about 138,500 people. Most of the casualties occurred when people were downed by falling trees or falling debris. Two people perished due to a landslide southeast of Manila. Moreover, 15 people died in the Batangas City, where electrical and water supplies was cut for two days. Twenty-three were wounded. However, damage to crops, especially rice, was minor. Throughout the country, 65 people were killed, 26 people were hurt, and 29 people were rendered missing. A total of 44,383 families or 248,040 residents were evacuated to shelter. In addition, 18,488 homes were damaged and 5,599 others were demolished. Damage in the country was assessed at US$23.3 million, including US$14.2 million in crops. (Note: All Philippine currencies are converted to United States Dollars using Philippines Measuring worth with an exchange rate of the year 1982.) Following the storm, President Ferdinand Marcos ordered for the release of $294,000 in aid.

Further north, in Hong Kong, a No 1. hurricane signal was issued a little after noon on September 11. Later that day, the signal was increased to a No. 3 signal, only to drop to a No. 1 signal on September 14. All signals were dropped late on September 15. A minimum pressure of 1005.8 mbar (29.70 inHg) was recorded at the Hong Kong Royal Observatory (HKO) on the afternoon of September 13. Waglan Island recorded a peak wind speed of 57 km/h (35 mph). Meanwhile, Lei Yue Mun observed a peak wind gust of 98 km/h (61 mph). Tate's Cairn observed 277.1 mm (10.91 in) of rain over a five-day period, including 175.7 mm (6.92 in) in a 24-hour period. In all, damage in Hong Kong was minor. Across the Leizhou Peninsula, serious crop damage was reported and 90% of homes were damaged.

== See also ==
- Typhoon Ellen (1983) - stronger but similar track and time of year
