= Typhoon Nelson (1985) =

Pacific typhoon in 1985

Typhoon Nelson (Ibiang)
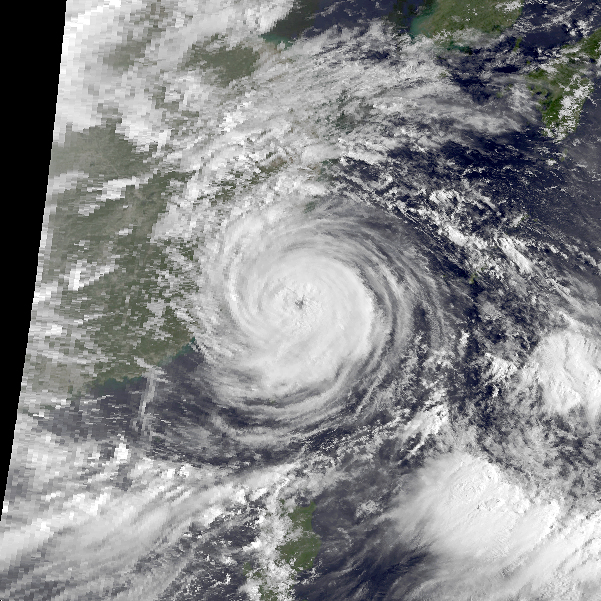
- Typhoon Nelson on August 22

Meteorological history
- Formed: August 16, 1985
- Dissipated: August 25, 1985

Typhoon
- 10-minute sustained (JMA)
- Highest winds: 150 km/h (90 mph)
- Lowest pressure: 960 hPa (mbar); 28.35 inHg

Category 2-equivalent typhoon
- 1-minute sustained (SSHWS/JTWC)
- Highest winds: 175 km/h (110 mph)

Overall effects
- Fatalities: 53
- Damage: $53 million (1985 USD)
- Areas affected: China, Taiwan
- IBTrACS
- Part of the 1985 Pacific typhoon season

Typhoon Nelson, known in the Philippines as Typhoon Ibiang, was the worst tropical cyclone to affect Southern China in 16 years. Typhoon Nelson, which developed on August 16, 1985, originated from an area of thunderstorm activity well east of the Philippines. It gradually intensified over the next several days while moving northwest. Nelson reached typhoon intensity early on August 20 and two days later, attained peak intensity before turning west. The cyclone brushed northern Taiwan early on August 23 after weakening slightly. Nelson then briefly restrengthened to peak intensity. During the afternoon of August 23, it made landfall in eastern China before dissipating on August 25.

Nelson brought heavy rains to Taiwan. Approximately 900,000 families were left without power and 100,000 telephone lines lost service. More than 20,000 trees were uprooted. Across the country, five people were killed. Affecting a country already inundated by summer rains, Typhoon Nelson brought additional flooding and significant damage to much of Southern China. There, the storm killed 48 individuals and hurt 329 others. More than 5,000 homes were destroyed while another 6,000 were damaged. Around 2,000 travelers were stranded due to flooding. Throughout China, losses from the storm totaled to $53 million (1985 USD).

== Meteorological history ==
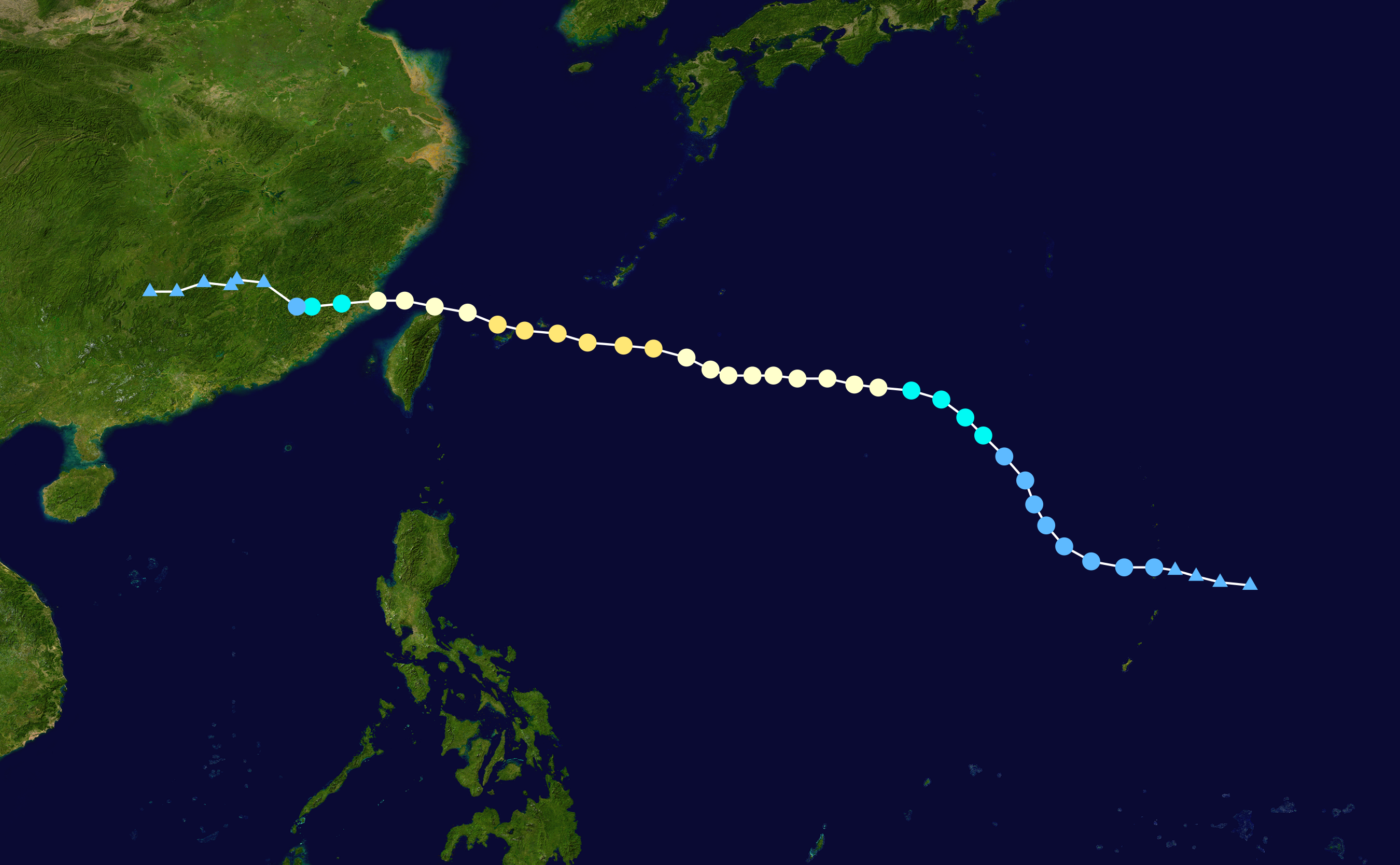
Map plotting the storm's track and intensity, according to the Saffir–Simpson scale Map key Saffir–Simpson scale Tropical depression (≤38 mph, ≤62 km/h) Tropical storm (39–73 mph, 63–118 km/h) Category 1 (74–95 mph, 119–153 km/h) Category 2 (96–110 mph, 154–177 km/h) Category 3 (111–129 mph, 178–208 km/h) Category 4 (130–156 mph, 209–251 km/h) Category 5 (≥157 mph, ≥252 km/h) Unknown Storm type Tropical cyclone Subtropical cyclone Extratropical cyclone, remnant low, tropical disturbance, or monsoon depression

The origins of Nelson can be traced back to a small and disorganized, but persistent area of disturbed weather, which was first observed on August 15. At this time, the convection was located 280 km (175 mi) northwest of Saipan. Initially, the system was located near the Intertropical Convergence Zone (ITCZ), which enhanced the disturbance's convection. The disturbance was also located near a cold core upper-level low and a tropical upper-tropospheric trough (TUTT). By 0300 UTC on August 15, the system had become slightly more organized. Three hours later, the Joint Typhoon Warning Center (JTWC) started watching the system. Thereafter, a dramatic increase in convection occurred over the northeast quadrant of the system. As such, the Japan Meteorological Agency (JMA) started watching the system early on August 16. (Note: The Japan Meteorological Agency is the official Regional Specialized Meteorological Center for the western Pacific Ocean.) Several hours later, a Tropical Cyclone Formation Alert (TCFA) was issued, even though a Hurricane Hunter aircraft did not locate a surface circulation. Early on August 17, the TCFA was re-issued. That afternoon, the disturbance became more organized, with classifications via the Dvorak technique yielding winds of 65 km/h (40 mph). Based on this, both the JTWC and the JMA upgraded the disturbance into Tropical Storm Nelson.

During the evening, a Hurricane Hunter aircraft reported a barometric pressure of 989 mbar (30 inHg); however, they noted that the strongest winds were 170 km (105 mi) north-northwest from the center. Early on August 18, data from another aircraft also noted that a subtropical ridge had extended west of Nelson; consequently, the JTWC correctly anticipated Nelson to move west-northwest. At midday, the JMA upgraded Nelson to a severe tropical storm. Subsequently, data from the JMA indicated that Nelson began to level off in intensity as the stronger winds remained displaced form the center. (Note: The Japan Meteorological Agency is the official Regional Specialized Meteorological Center for the western Pacific Ocean.) However, the JTWC upgraded Nelson to typhoon intensity following Hurricane Hunter reports of a 10 km (6.2 mi) eye, winds of 75 mph (120 km/h), and a pressure of 979 mbar (28.9 inHg). At 0000 UTC on August 20, the JMA estimated that Nelson attained typhoon strength, with winds of 130 km/h (80 mph). Nearing Taiwan, Nelson once again held on to its intensity for 36 hours before strengthening slightly. Late on August 21, the JTWC announced that Nelson reached peak intensity, with 175 km/h (110 mph), equivalent to a Category 2 hurricane on the United States-based Saffir-Simpson Hurricane Wind Scale (SSHWS). Early on August 22, the JMA reported that Nelson attained peak winds of 140 km/h (85 mph).

Shortly after its peak, the storm weakened slightly thereafter as the typhoon passed between the Yaeyama Islands and the Miyako Islands. According to the JMA, the storm re-attained peak intensity at 0000 UTC on August 23. At this time, the agency assessed the pressure of the system at 955 mbar (28.2 inHg). Shortly thereafter, Nelson skirted northern Taiwan, passing 45 km (30 mi) from Taipei. After entering the Formosa Strait, the storm moved ashore southwest of Fuzhou at 1400 UTC on August 23. At the time of landfall, the JMA estimated winds of 80 mph (130 km/h). By August 25, both the JMA and JTWC had ceased tracking Nelson, as it had moved inland over China. (Note: Wind estimates from the JMA and most other basins throughout the world are sustained over 10 minutes, while estimates from the United States-based Joint Typhoon Warning Center are sustained over 1 minute. 10 minute winds are about 1.14 times the amount of 1 minute winds.)

== Preparations and impact ==
=== Taiwan ===
Due to the threat of Nelson, a typhoon warning was issued for the island. After the storm battered the island, rail and street traffic in the northern part of the island was halted due to mudslides. Both Chiang Kai-shek International Airport and the Taipei Songshan Airport in Taipei were closed for about 12 hours. Approximately 900,000 families were left without electrical service and 100,000 telephone lines were disrupted. Water supplies in many areas were also affected and about 20,000 trees in Taipei were damaged. As much as 440 mm (17 in) of rain fell in some parts of the island of Taiwan.

Five people perished in the country. Three men were killed in Taipei, two when they were struck by wind-blown objects and one when a house collapsed. Elsewhere, a fatality was reported because of a landslide in Taichung. Moreover, at least 15 other people were reportedly injured throughout Taiwan. A woman in the harbor city of Keelung was struck in the head and seriously injured by a broken window.

=== China ===
Already affecting an area that was inundated by prior flooding partially caused by Typhoon Mamie, Nelson brought additional flooding and significant damage to much of Southern China. The storm was accountable for 48 lives and 329 injuries in the province of Fujian. More than 5,000 dwellings were destroyed; 6,000 others were damaged. Around 2,000 travelers were stranded. A total of 969 fishing boats sunk, and about 178,500 acres (72,235 ha) of crops were lost. Power lines were downed in 11 counties, which included Putian and the provincial capital of Fuzhou. Many highways received flooding. Water and electrical supplies were cut in Putian City. Along Pingtan Island and Fuqing, many houses were demolished and considerable damaged occurred to crops such as sugar cane. The offshore island of Yangtan was the hardest hit, where 15 villages lost power. Typhoon Nelson was considered the worst typhoon to hit China in 16 years, but also helped relieve drought conditions in the southern portion of the nation.

== See also ==
- Typhoon Hal (1985)
- Typhoon Haikui (2012)
- Typhoon Haikui (2023)
