= List of storms named Isabel =

The name Isabel was used for two tropical cyclones in the Atlantic Ocean and one in the south-West Indian Ocean.

In the Atlantic:

- Tropical Storm Isabel (1985) – made landfall near Fernandina Beach, Florida; caused 180 deaths and over $200 million in damage from torrential rainfall in Puerto Rico
- Hurricane Isabel (2003) – a Category 5 Cape Verde-type hurricane; total damages were estimated at $3.37 billion.

The name Isabel was retired after the 2003 season, and was replaced by Ida in the 2009 season.

In the South-West Indian:

- Tropical Storm Isabel (1962) Formed near Madagascar, stayed out to sea

== See also ==
- Hurricane Isbell – a similar name which was used once in the Atlantic.
- Cyclone Isobel – a similar name which was used four times in the Australian region of the South-East Indian Ocean.
