= List of storms named Irah =

The name Irah has been used for three tropical cyclones in the East Pacific Ocean:

- Tropical Storm Irah (1963)
- Tropical Storm Irah (1969)
- Hurricane Irah (1973)
