= List of storms named Ivo =

The name Ivo has been used for five tropical cyclones in the East Pacific Ocean:

- Tropical Storm Ivo (2001) – paralleled the Mexican coast
- Hurricane Ivo (2007) – a Category 1 hurricane that affected Baja California without making landfall
- Tropical Storm Ivo (2013) – weak storm that paralleled Baja California
- Tropical Storm Ivo (2019) – strong tropical storm that affected Mexico without making landfall
- Tropical Storm Ivo (2025) – affected Mexico without making landfall

== See also ==
- Tropical Storm Ivone (2025) – a South-West Indian Ocean tropical cyclone with a similar name
