= Typhoon Cora (1969) =

Pacific typhoon in 1969

Typhoon Cora (Ibiang)
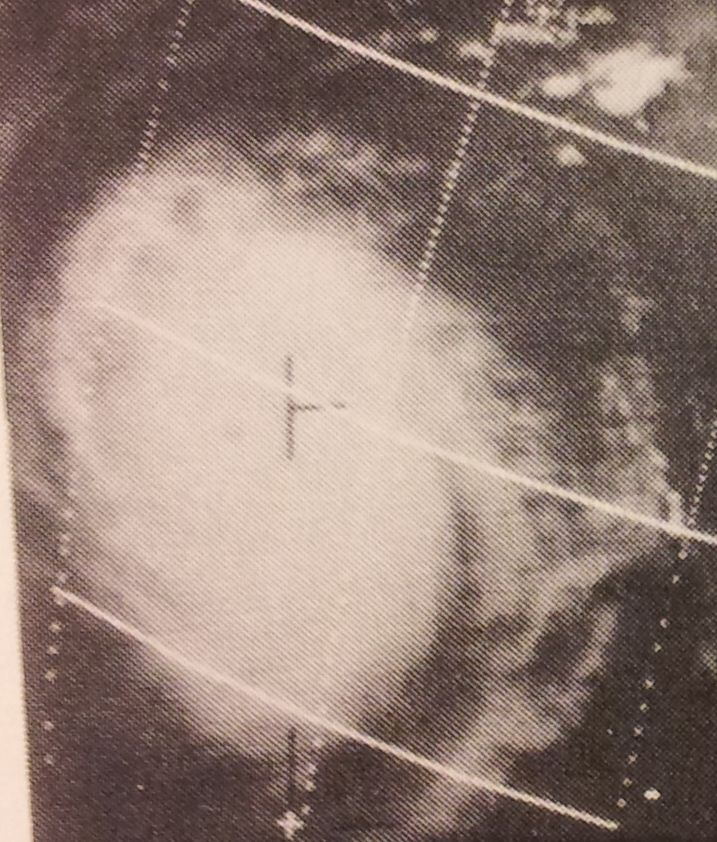
- Typhoon Cora on August 19.

Meteorological history
- Formed: August 12, 1969
- Extratropical: August 21, 1969
- Dissipated: August 23, 1969

Typhoon
- 10-minute sustained (JMA)
- Lowest pressure: 935 hPa (mbar); 27.61 inHg

Category 2-equivalent typhoon
- 1-minute sustained (SSHWS/JTWC)
- Highest winds: 155 km/h (100 mph)
- Lowest pressure: 948 hPa (mbar); 27.99 inHg

Overall effects
- Fatalities: 1
- Injuries: 37
- Damage: Unknown
- Areas affected: Caroline Islands; Ryukyu Islands; Japan
- Part of the 1969 Pacific typhoon season

Typhoon Cora, known in the Philippines as Typhoon Ibiang, was a moderately strong typhoon that caused significant impacts in Japan and the Caroline Islands during the 1969 Pacific typhoon season. Tropical Depression 09W formed on August 12, 1969, 2 days after Typhoon Betty (Huling) dissipated. The depression intensified into Tropical Storm Cora on August 14 and had later intensified into Typhoon Cora 4 days later. Cora made landfall in the Ryukyu Islands on August 19 right after the storm intensified into Category 2 status. Okinawa Island received minor damage. After making landfall in Kyushu–Honshu, Cora transitioned into a extratropical state and finished on August 21. Cora dissipated on August 23, 1969.

== Meteorological history ==
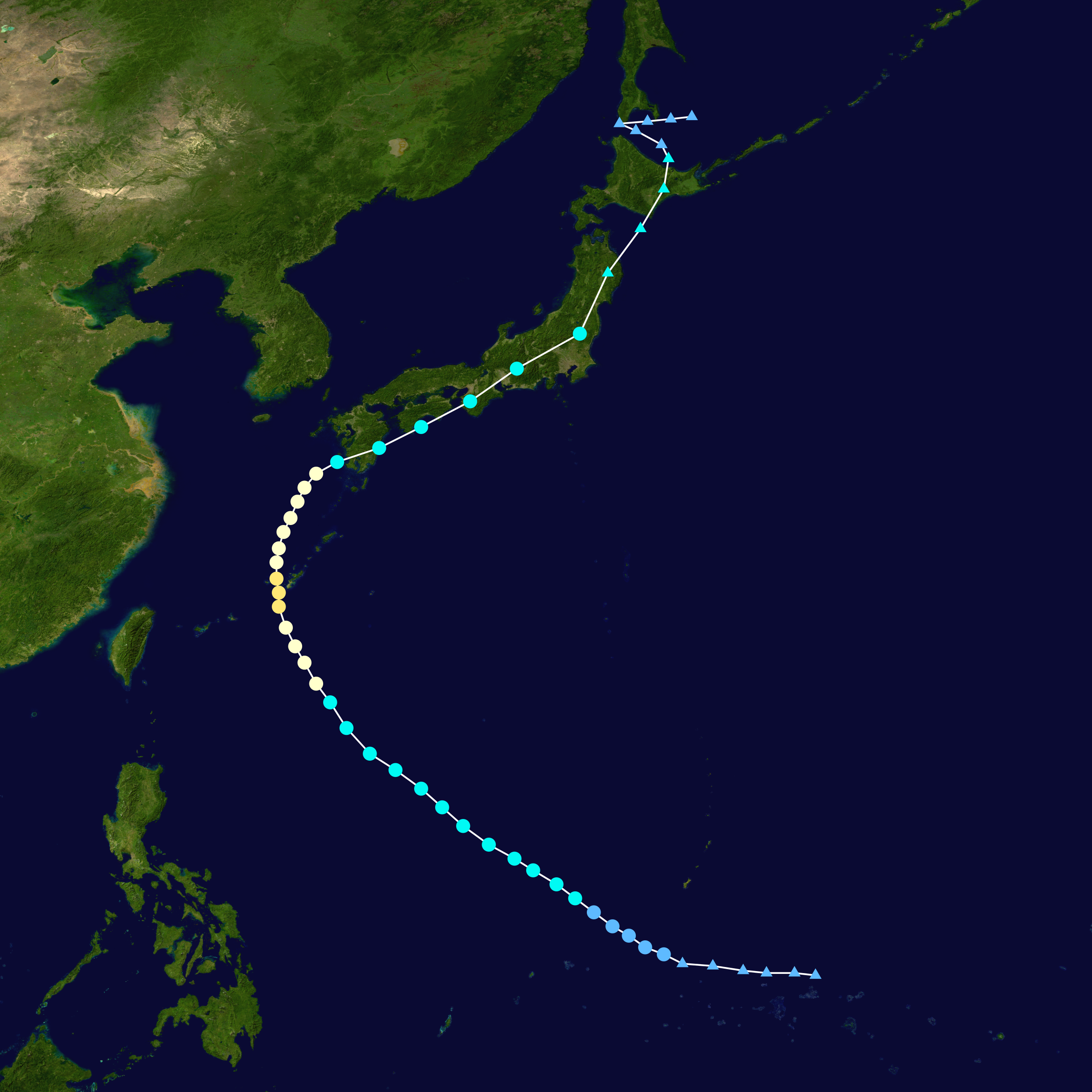
Map plotting the storm's track and intensity, according to the Saffir–Simpson scale Map key Saffir–Simpson scale Tropical depression (≤38 mph, ≤62 km/h) Tropical storm (39–73 mph, 63–118 km/h) Category 1 (74–95 mph, 119–153 km/h) Category 2 (96–110 mph, 154–177 km/h) Category 3 (111–129 mph, 178–208 km/h) Category 4 (130–156 mph, 209–251 km/h) Category 5 (≥157 mph, ≥252 km/h) Unknown Storm type Tropical cyclone Subtropical cyclone Extratropical cyclone, remnant low, tropical disturbance, or monsoon depression

At 6:00 UTC, on August 12, 1969, the Joint Typhoon Warning Center began to monitor a tropical depression that had formed north of the Caroline Islands. Damaging most of the Caroline Islands, the tropical depression moved north, and on August 14, at 23:00 UTC, the storm intensified into a tropical storm with winds up to 35 miles per hour (56 km/h). Then the tropical storm was given the name Cora. Tropical Storm Cora traveled into the Philippine Area of Responsibility and was designated as Tropical Storm Ibiang on August 16 at 23:00 UTC.

After bringing rain to the Philippines and Taiwan, Cora left the Philippine Area of Responsibility and with winds up to 100 miles per hour (160 km/h), the storm intensified to typhoon status at 11:00 UTC. A day later, on August 18, Typhoon Cora intensified into Category 2 status with winds up to 85 miles per hour (137 km/h). Soon after, Cora began to make a definite eye formation and finished the same day. As it made landfall in the Ryukyu Islands mainly Okinawa), Cora moved up to the island of Kyushū with winds up to 70 knots (81 mph) at 23:00 UTC on August 20. Honshū received a downpour of rain from Typhoon Cora.

Cora then began to transition into a extratropical state. Typhoon Cora finished on August 21 at 16:00 UTC. The extratropical cyclone moved up with winds up to 40 knots (46 mph). After crossing Honshū and producing rain, Cora dissipated near Hokkaidō on August 23 at 05:00 UTC. Cora was the only typhoon that had impacted Japan that season and the second tropical cyclone to impact Japan before Severe Tropical Storm Alice.

== Preparations and impact ==
Before Typhoon Cora made landfall, there were up to 34 warnings and 15 of those were at typhoon intensity by the Joint Typhoon Warning Center and the Japan Meteorological Agency. As a tropical depression, Cora brought rainfall over the Caroline Islands, one of them being the Woleai Atoll.

After intensifying into a Category 2 typhoon, Typhoon Cora struck the Ryukyu Islands with heavy rain and caused families within low-lying coasts to flee. After causing minor damage, Typhoon Cora then killed one person and injured 37 people on the island of Okinawa on August 19. Before Cora's dissipation on the 23 of August, Cora left hundreds without homes and left police to help recover from the damage. Cora had also brought rain up to Hokkaidō and Honshū before it dissipated on August 23.

== See also ==
- 1969 Pacific typhoon season
