= List of named storms (Y) =

Storms are named for historical reasons to avoid confusion when communicating with the public, as more than one storm can exist at a time. Names are drawn in order from predetermined lists. For tropical cyclones, names are assigned when a system has one-, three-, or ten-minute winds of more than 65 km/h (40 mph). Standards, however, vary from basin to basin. For example, some tropical depressions are named in the Western Pacific, while within the Australian and Southern Pacific regions, the naming of tropical cyclones are delayed until they have gale-force winds occurring more than halfway around the storm center.

This list covers the letter Y.

== Storms ==
Note: † indicates the name was retired after that usage in the respective basin.

- Yaas (2021) – a very severe cyclonic storm made landfall in southern Bengal and northwestern Odisha.
- Yagi

- 2000 – a Category 3 typhoon that moved through the Ryukyu Islands; also known as Paring within the Philippine Area of Responsibility (PAR).
- 2006 – a Category 5 super typhoon that struck Chichijima and Iwo Jima.
- 2013 – a storm that formed east of Luzon and dissipated south of Japan; also known as Dante within the PAR.
- 2018 – a storm that affected the Philippines before making landfall in Zhejiang, China; also known as Karding within the PAR.
- 2024† – an extremely destructive Category 5-equivalent typhoon that ravaged Indochina and Hainan; also known as Enteng within the PAR.

- Yakecan (2022) – a subtropical storm that passed through the southern region of Brazil.
- Yaku (2023) – an unusual low-pressure system in the far Southeastern Pacific that impacted Ecuador and northern Peru.
- Yali

- 1987 – a tropical cyclone that passed near New Caledonia and Vanuatu.
- 1998 – a category 2 tropical cyclone that affected New Caledonia and Vanuatu as a tropical cyclone, and its remnants killed one person while crossing through New Zealand.

- Yalo (2016) – a tropical cyclone that moved through French Polynesia.
- Yamaneko (2022) – a weak tropical storm that raged in the open ocean away from land.
- Yancy

- 1990 – a Category 2 typhoon that impacted the Philippines, Taiwan and southeastern China, claiming at least 284 lives; also known as Gading within the PAR.
- 1993 – a Category 4 super typhoon that struck Japan, leaving US$1.67 billion in damage and 47 deaths; also known as Tasing within the PAR.

- Yani (2006) – a tropical cyclone that stalled and dissipated near Solomon Islands.
- Yaning

- 1974 – a tropical storm that affected the Philippines, Vietnam and Thailand; also known as Faye beyond the PAR.
- 1978 – a tropical storm that crossed the Philippines, killing 59, and then made landfall in Eastern China; also known as Nina beyond the PAR.
- 1982 – a tropical depression northeast of the Philippines.
- 1986 – a Category 4 super typhoon that remained over the open ocean; also known as Kim beyond the PAR.
- 1994 – a short-lived tropical depression that formed near the Visayas.

- Yanni (1998) – a strong typhoon that skirted the coast of Taiwan before striking South Korea as a tropical storm, claiming 50 lives; also known as Heling within the PAR.
- Yanyan (2003)† – a tropical storm that stalled near the Marshall Islands.
- Yasa (2020)† – a powerful Category 5 tropical cyclone that made landfall on Fiji.
- Yasi

- 1996 – a tropical storm that brought heavy rainfall to Tonga.
- 2011† – a powerful and destructive Category 4 tropical cyclone that struck Queensland, causing over US$3 billion in damage.

- Yates (1996) – a Category 4 super typhoon that struck Northern Marianas Islands.
- Yayang

- 1967 – a Category 2-equivalent typhoon that struck Vietnam; also known as Freda beyond the PAR.
- 1971 – a Category 5 super typhoon that struck Taiwan and Fujian; also known as Bess beyond the PAR.
- 1979 – a Category 5 super typhoon that weakened before hitting Luzon; also known as Vera beyond the PAR.
- 1983 – a Category 1 typhoon that formed in the South China Sea and interacted with Typhoon Orchid; also known as Percy beyond the PAR.
- 1991 – struck the Philippines.

- Yemyin (2007) – a deadly cyclonic storm that made landfall in India and in Pakistan.
- Yeyeng

- 1965 – a tropical storm that remained over the open ocean; also known as Wendy beyond the PAR.
- 1977 – a Category 2 typhoon that moved through the Marshall Islands; also known as Mary beyond the PAR.
- 1981 – a Category 3 typhoon that moved across the central Philippines and struck northern Vietnam; also known as Hazen beyond the PAR.
- 1989 – a tropical depression recognized only within the PAR.
- 1993 – a severe tropical storm that brushed Luzon before striking Guangdong, China; also known as Becky beyond the PAR.

- Yinxing (2024) – a Category 4 typhoon that impacted the Philippines before later affecting Vietnam.
- Yolanda

- 1992 – a tropical storm that churned in the open ocean far from the southwest coast of Mexico.
- 2013† – a devastating Category 5 super typhoon and one of the most powerful on record, that killed over 6,352 and caused more than $2.98 billion (2013 USD) in damage, primarily in the Philippines; also known as Haiyan beyond the PAR.

- Yolande

- 1972 – a tropical cyclone that churned in the open South Pacific.
- 2002 – a tropical cyclone that formed east of Tonga.

- Yoling

- 1966 – a tropical depression that dissipated over Mindanao.
- 1970† – a destructive and deadly Category 4 super typhoon that struck the Philippines and Vietnam; also known as Patsy beyond the PAR.

- Yoning

- 1964 – a Category 4 typhoon that passed north of Luzon and struck near Hong Kong, killing over 750 people; also known as Ruby beyond the PAR.
- 1976 – a tropical storm that passed east of Luzon and Taiwan then curved, passing south of Japan; also known as Marge beyond the PAR.
- 1980 – a tropical storm that formed over the Philippines and struck Vietnam; also known as Cary beyond the PAR.
- 1984 – a Category 3 typhoon that remained over the open ocean; also known as Clara beyond the PAR.
- 1988† – a Category 4 typhoon that killed over 200 people while crossing the Philippines; also known as Skip beyond the PAR.

- York (1999) – a tropical storm that made landfall in Guangdong, China, killing 15 people.
- Yoyong (2004) – a Category 4 super typhoon that struck the Philippines and Taiwan; also known as Nanmadol beyond the PAR.
- Yoyoy (2003) – a Category 5 super typhoon that left heavy damage in the Federated States of Micronesia; also known as Lupit beyond the PAR.
- Yule (1997) – a severe tropical storm that formed well east of Japan and tracked northward.
- Yun-yeung (2023) – a weak tropical storm minimal affected Japan.
- Yunya

- 1991 – a Category 3 typhoon that struck Luzon at the same time as the eruption of Mount Pinatubo, which contributed to lahars (landslides) that killed around 300 people; also known as Diding within the PAR.
- 1994 – a tropical storm that caused landslides on Luzon, killing 11 people.

- Yuri

- 1991 – a Category 5 super typhoon that passed near Guam, leaving 90% of the island without power.
- 1994 – a minimal tropical storm that remained far from land.

- Yutu

- 2001 – a Category 2 typhoon that hit Guangdong. China; also known as Huaning within the PAR.
- 2007 – a Category 4 typhoon that passed over Okinotorishima and near Iwo Jima; also known as Amang within the PAR.
- 2013 – only classified a tropical storm by the JMA; classified as subtropical depression by JTWC; also known as Diding within the PAR.
- 2018† – a Category 5 super typhoon that caused catastrophic destruction on the islands of Tinian and Saipan in the Northern Mariana Islands, and later impacted the Philippines; also known as Rosita within the PAR.

- Yvette

- 1992 – a Category 5 super typhoon that curved away from the Philippines; also known as Ningning within the PAR.
- 1995 – a Category 1 typhoon that struck the Philippines and Vietnam; also known as Oniang in the PAR.
- 2016 – a tropical cyclone that meandered off shore from Western Australia.

- Yvonne

- 1945 – a tropical storm that struck Vietnam.
- 1971 – a tropical storm that formed in the Australian region of the Indian Ocean; renamed Lise when it crossed into the South-West Indian basin.
- 1974 – a tropical storm that struck Australia's Cape York Peninsula.

== See also ==
- European windstorm names
- Atlantic hurricane season
- List of Pacific hurricane seasons
- Tropical cyclone naming
- South Atlantic tropical cyclone
- Tropical cyclone
