= Typhoon Wilda (1964) =

Pacific typhoon in 1964

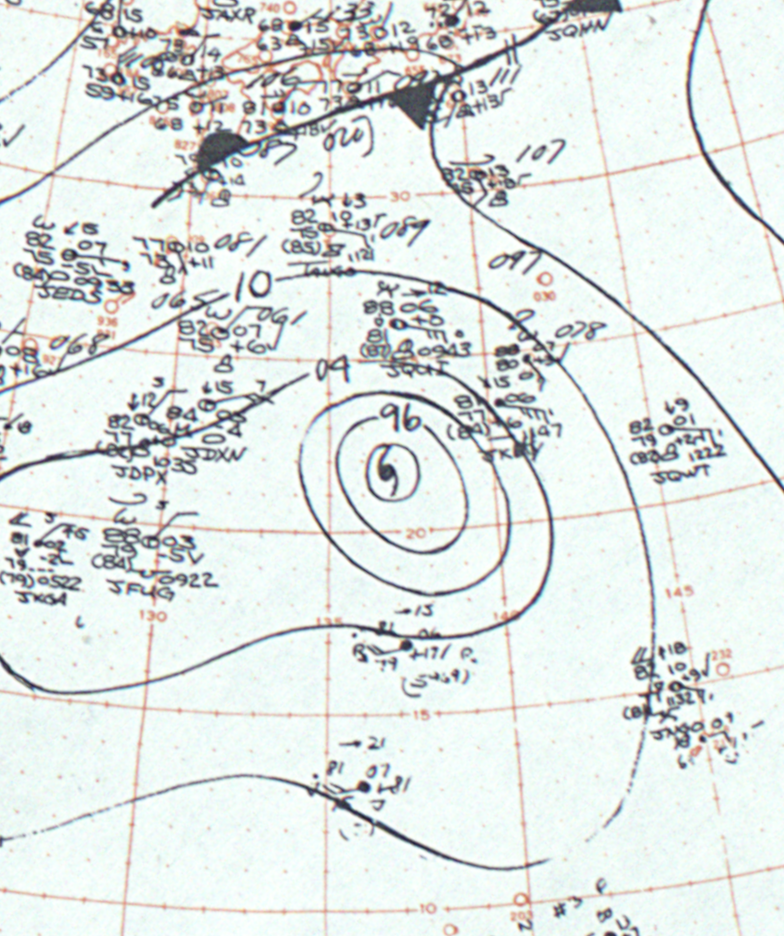
- Typhoon Wilda's surface analysis on September 21, 1964

Meteorological history
- Formed: September 16, 1964
- Dissipated: September 25, 1964

Unknown-strength storm
- 10-minute sustained (JMA)
- Lowest pressure: 895 hPa (mbar); 26.43 inHg

Category 5-equivalent super typhoon
- 1-minute sustained (SSHWS/JTWC)
- Highest winds: 280 km/h (175 mph)
- Lowest pressure: 905 hPa (mbar); 26.72 inHg

Overall effects
- Fatalities: 43
- Damage: Unknown
- Areas affected: Mariana Islands, Japan
- IBTrACS
- Part of the 1964 Pacific typhoon season

Typhoon Wilda was an intense typhoon that was tied for lowest central pressure of any typhoon in 1964, along with Typhoon Sally. As the twenty-fourth named storm of the season, it origins can be traced back to when it was as a tropical storm east-southeast of Guam on September 16. Wilda moved northwestward for multiple days. it was identified as a tropical storm by Joint Typhoon Warning Center on September 19, strengthening into a typhoon that day. It reached its peak intensity over the Philippine Sea. Wilda slightly weakened following peak strength before curving northward and making landfall on September 24. The storm would eventually emerge into the Sea of Japan and curve northeast. Wilda made a final landfall on September 25 as a tropical storm, thereafter, departing Japan and quickly moving towards the central Aleutian Islands as a powerful extratropical cyclone, dissipating on September 27.

== Meteorological history ==
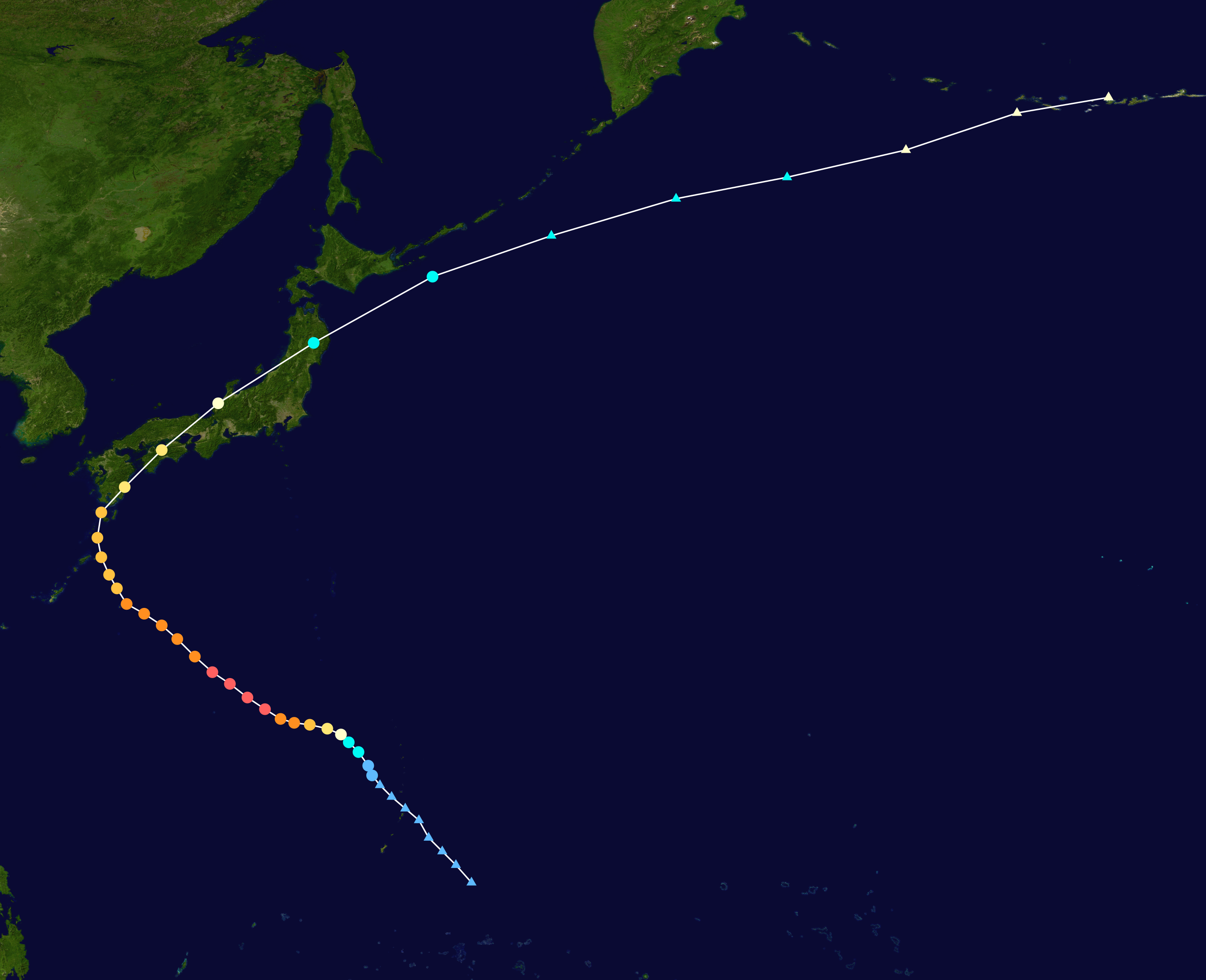
Map plotting the storm's track and intensity, according to the Saffir–Simpson scale Map key Saffir–Simpson scale Tropical depression (≤38 mph, ≤62 km/h) Tropical storm (39–73 mph, 63–118 km/h) Category 1 (74–95 mph, 119–153 km/h) Category 2 (96–110 mph, 154–177 km/h) Category 3 (111–129 mph, 178–208 km/h) Category 4 (130–156 mph, 209–251 km/h) Category 5 (≥157 mph, ≥252 km/h) Unknown Storm type Tropical cyclone Subtropical cyclone Extratropical cyclone, remnant low, tropical disturbance, or monsoon depression

According to data from the Japan Meteorological Agency, Wilda began as a tropical storm east-southeast of Guam on September 16, marked by a large mass of clouds and associated rainbands. The system tracked northwest over the Northern Mariana Islands and into the Philippine Sea two days later. The Joint Typhoon Warning Center recognized the storm as a tropical cyclone on September 19 when it was located roughly 370 km (230 mi) northwest of Saipan and assessed Wilda to have strengthened into a typhoon later that day. An eye emerged on Nimbus satellite imagery on September 20, and on September 21, Wilda reached its peak intensity over the Philippine Sea with one-minute maximum sustained winds of 280 km/h (170 mph) as estimated by the JTWC and a minimum central pressure of 895 hPa (mbar; 26.43 inHg). Based on data from the JMA, this was tied for lowest central pressure of any typhoon in 1964, along with Typhoon Sally. Wilda slightly weakened following peak strength before curving northward and making landfall on Kagoshima on September 24; one-minute sustained winds three hours prior to landfall were estimated to be 185 km/h (115 mph). The storm passed over Shikoku and southern Honshu before emerging into the Sea of Japan and curving northeast. Wilda made a final landfall on the western coast of northern Honshu on September 25 as a tropical storm, thereafter, departing Japan and quickly moving towards the central Aleutian Islands as a powerful extratropical cyclone. The storm was last identified on September 27.

== Preparations and impact ==
Wilda was one of the strongest typhoons to ever strike Japan as measured by atmospheric pressure, reaching Cape Sata in Kagoshima with a central pressure of 940 hPa (mbar; 27.76 inHg). The typhoon caused 47 fatalities and 530 injuries in Japan. Over 70,000 homes were destroyed and nearly 45,000 were inundated by the typhoon across the country, leaving thousands of people homeless. The southern and eastern coasts of Kyushu, the southern coast of Shikoku, and Hyōgo Prefecture experienced the highest proportion of destroyed homes per capita. At least 64 ships were sunk with another 192 damaged or lost. Damage was widespread in the northern Ryukyu Islands. Banana, sugar cane, and vegetable fields in Amami Ōshima were badly damaged, along with roofs and windows. Naze lost power during the storm. Wilda brought 6-meter (20-foot) waves to southern Kyushu. One British freighter ran aground off Kagoshima and broke into two; all 41 crew were rescued. The widespread flooding in the region overtopped dikes and disrupted air and rail traffic. At Uwajima, Ehime, a peak wind gust of 259 km/h (161 mph) was observed; this was the strongest wind recorded in connection with the Wilda in Japan. An 8,547-ton Indonesian freighter with 53 crew ran aground and keeled over at the Port of Kobe. Gale-force winds from Wilda reached the Tokyo area, damaging roofs at the Tokyo Olympic Village and uprooting trees two weeks before the start of the 1964 Summer Olympics. A ship just south of Tokyo Bay reported winds of 76 km/h (47 mph).

== See also ==
- Typhoon Vera (1959) – an intense and deadly typhoon that was also known as the Isewan Typhoon.
- Typhoon Chaba (2004) – an intense typhoon that took a comparable track.
- Typhoon Songda (2004) – another intense typhoon that affected similar areas, not long after Chaba did.
- Typhoon Jebi (2018) – the costliest typhoon in Japan's history in terms of insured losses.
- Typhoon Krosa (2019) – a typhoon that took a nearly identical track.
