= Nimbus program =

Second-generation U.S. robotic spacecraft

Nimbus
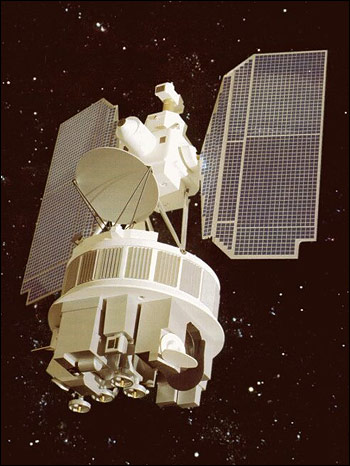
- Artist's drawing of the general design of the Nimbus series of satellites. The solar-panel "wings" move throughout the day to track the Sun during the daylight part of the satellite's orbit. The 10-foot-tall satellite has the attitude control system on top, separated from a 5-foot-diameter "sensory ring" (center) with scaffolding. The sensory ring holds the batteries and electronics for each of the sensors that are mounted underneath the ring (bottom).
- Manufacturer: General Electric; RCA Astro
- Country of origin: United States
- Operator: NASA
- Applications: Weather

Specifications
- Regime: Low Earth

Production
- Status: Disabled
- Built: 8
- Failed: 1
- Maiden launch: Nimbus 1
- Last launch: Nimbus 7

The Nimbus satellites were second-generation U.S. robotic spacecraft launched between 1964 and 1978 used for meteorological research and development. The spacecraft were designed to serve as stabilized, Earth-oriented platforms for the testing of advanced systems to sense and collect atmospheric science data. Seven Nimbus spacecraft have been launched into near-polar, Sun-synchronous orbits beginning with Nimbus 1 on August 28, 1964. On board the Nimbus satellites are various instrumentation for imaging, sounding, and other studies in different spectral regions. The Nimbus satellites were launched aboard Thor-Agena rockets (Nimbus 1–4) and Delta rockets (Nimbus 5–7).

Over a 20-year period from the launch of the first satellite, the Nimbus series of missions was the United States' primary research and development platform for satellite remote sensing of the Earth. The seven Nimbus satellites, launched over a fourteen-year period, shared their space-based observations of the planet for thirty years. NASA transferred the technology tested and refined by the Nimbus missions to the National Oceanic and Atmospheric Administration (NOAA) for its operational satellite instruments. The technology and lessons learned from the Nimbus missions are the heritage of most of the Earth-observing satellites NASA and NOAA have launched over the past three decades.

== Contributions ==
=== Weather forecasting ===
At the time of its launch, the idea that intangible properties such as air pressure could be observed using a satellite orbiting hundreds of miles above the Earth was revolutionary. With each Nimbus mission, scientists broadened their ability to collect atmospheric characteristics that improved weather forecasting, including ocean and air temperatures, air pressure, and cloudiness. Beginning with the Nimbus 3 satellite in 1969, temperature information through the atmospheric column began to be retrieved by satellites from the eastern Atlantic and most of the Pacific Ocean, which led to significant forecast improvements. The global coverage provided by Nimbus satellites made accurate 3–5 day forecasts possible for the first time.

The ability of the Nimbus satellites to detect electromagnetic energy in multiple wavelengths (multi-spectral data), in particular the microwave region of the electromagnetic spectrum, made it possible for scientists to look into the atmosphere and tell the difference between water vapor and liquid water in clouds. In addition, they were able to measure atmospheric temperature even in the presence of clouds, a capability that allowed scientists to take the temperature in the "warm core" of hurricanes.

=== Radiation budget ===
One of the most important scientific contributions of the Nimbus missions was their measurements of the Earth's radiation budget. For the first time, scientists had global, direct observations of the amount of solar radiation entering and exiting the Earth system. The observations helped to verify and refine the earliest climate models, and are still making important contributions to the study of climate change. As scientists consider the causes and effects of global warming, Nimbus radiation budget data provide a base for long-term analyses and make change-detection studies possible. The Nimbus technology gave rise to current radiation-budget sensors, such as the CERES instruments on NASA's Terra and Aqua satellites.

=== Ozone layer ===
Even before the Nimbus satellites began collecting their observations of Earth's ozone layer, scientists had some understanding of the processes that maintained or destroyed it. They were pretty sure they understood how the layer formed, and they knew from laboratory experiments that halogens could destroy ozone. Finally, weather balloons had revealed that the concentration of ozone in the atmosphere changed over time, and scientists suspected weather phenomena or seasonal change were responsible. But how all of these pieces of information worked together on a global scale was still unclear.

Scientists conducted experiments from NASA experimental aircraft and proved that atmospheric chemicals such as the chlorofluorocarbons (CFCs) released from refrigerants and aerosol sprays did destroy ozone. As Nimbus 7 satellite observations accumulated between 1978 and 1994, it became increasingly clear that CFCs were creating an ozone hole each winter season over Antarctica. Not only that, but despite some year-to-year variations, it appeared the hole was becoming larger. The Nimbus measurements made clear how severe the ozone hole problem was.

NASA's Nimbus contractors
Company	System	Amount*
General Electric	Prime	$2,100,000
General Electric	Control & stabilization	1,515,710
General Electric	5-watt transmitter	92,652
RCA	Cameras & solar power	302,324
RCA	Vidicon and solar power	—N/a
IT&T Labs	High-resolution IR radiometer	139,235
Santa Barbara Research Center	Medium-resolution IR	343,426
New Mexico College of Agriculture and Mechanic Arts	Antennas	69,384
California Computer Products, Inc.	Clock	—N/a
Ampex	Tape recorder	—N/a
Radiation Inc.	PCM telemetry	—N/a
Contract sums are for research for development and delivery for first two Nimbus launchings

=== Sea ice ===
Nimbus satellites collected orbital data on the extent of the polar caps in the mid-1960s, recorded in the visible and infrared parts of the spectrum. These first global snapshots of Earth's icecaps provide invaluable reference points for climate change studies. During a narrowing window of opportunity for data archaeology, the National Snow and Ice Data Center (NDISC) and NASA were able to recover data that allowed the reconstruction of high-resolution Nimbus 2 images from 1966 showing the entire Arctic and Antarctic ice caps.

When the Nimbus 5 spacecraft launched in 1972, scientists planned for its Electrically Scanning Microwave Radiometer to collect global observations of where and how much it rained across the world. However, a new priority for the sensor evolved in the months following its launch: mapping global sea ice concentrations. When Nimbus 7 launched in 1978, technology had improved enough for scientists to distinguish newly formed (i.e., "first year") sea ice from older ice, with the Scanning Multichannel Microwave Radiometer (SMMR) sensor. The data it collected during its 9-year lifespan provide a significant chunk of the long-term record of Earth's sea ice concentration that today's scientists use for studies of climate change.

Among the most serendipitous discoveries that the Nimbus missions made possible was that of a gaping hole in the sea ice around Antarctica in the Southern Hemisphere winters of 1974–76. In a phenomenon that has not been observed since, an enormous, ice-free patch of water, called a polynya, developed three years in a row in the seasonal ice that encases Antarctica each winter. Located in the Weddell Sea, each year the polynya vanished with the summer melt, but returned the following year. The open patch of water may have influenced ocean temperatures as far down as 2,500 meters and influenced ocean circulation over a wide area. The Weddell Sea Polynya has not been observed since the event witnessed by the Nimbus satellites in the mid-70s.

=== Global positioning system ===
Nimbus satellites (beginning with Nimbus 3 in 1969) blazed the trail into the modern GPS era with operational search and rescue and data collection systems. The satellites tested the first technology that allowed satellites to locate weather-observation stations set up in remote locations and to command the stations to transmit their data back to the satellite. The most famous demonstration of the new technology was through the record-breaking flight of British aviator Sheila Scott, who tested the Nimbus navigation and locator communication system when she made the first-ever solo flight over the North Pole in 1971.

The Nimbus ground-to-satellite-to-ground communication system demonstrated the first satellite-based search and rescue system. Among the earliest successes were the rescue of two hot air balloonists who went down in the North Atlantic in 1977 and, later that year, tracking a Japanese adventurer on his first attempt to be the first person to dogsled solo to the North Pole through Greenland. Tens of thousands of people over the past three decades have been rescued through the Search and Rescue Satellite-aided Tracking (SARSAT) operational system on NOAA satellites.

=== Nuclear power ===
Nimbus-3 was the first satellite to use a SNAP-19 radioisotope thermoelectric generator (RTG) in space. A previous attempt was made to launch a SNAP-19 RTG on Nimbus-B-1, but the rocket was destroyed and the nuclear fuel landed in the Santa Barbara Channel. Later, the fuel was recovered from the wreckage at a depth of 300 feet (91 m) and re-purposed for Nimbus-3 as the SNAP-19B. This power source augmented the solar array with an additional 28.2 W of electrical power.

== Operation history of the Nimbus satellites ==
Satellite	Launch Date	Decay Date	Perigee	Apogee	Launch site	Launch Vehicle	COSPAR ID	Mass
Nimbus 1	August 28, 1964	May 16, 1974	429 km	937 km	Vandenberg 75-1-1	Thor-Agena B	1964-052A	374 kg
Nimbus 2	May 15, 1966	January 17, 1969	1103 km	1169 km	Vandenberg 75-1-1	Thor-Agena B	1966-040A	413 kg
Nimbus B	May 18, 1968	Destroyed at launch	---	---	Vandenberg SLC-2E	Thor-Agena D	—N/a	572 kg
Nimbus 3	April 13, 1969	January 22, 1972	1075 km	1135 km	Vandenberg SLC-2E	Thor-Agena B	1969-037A	576 kg
Nimbus 4	April 8, 1970	September 30, 1980	1092 km	1108 km	Vandenberg SLC-2E	Thor-Agena	1970-025A	619 kg
Nimbus 5	December 11, 1972	-	1089 km	1101 km	Vandenberg SLC-2W	Delta	1972-097A	770 kg
Nimbus 6	June 12, 1975	-	1093 km	1101 km	Vandenberg SLC-2W	Delta	1975-052A	585 kg
Nimbus 7	October 24, 1978	1994	941 km	954 km	Vandenberg SLC-2W	Delta	1978-098A	832 kg

== See also ==
- Coastal Zone Color Scanner
