= Nimbus 2 =

Former U.S. meteorological satellite

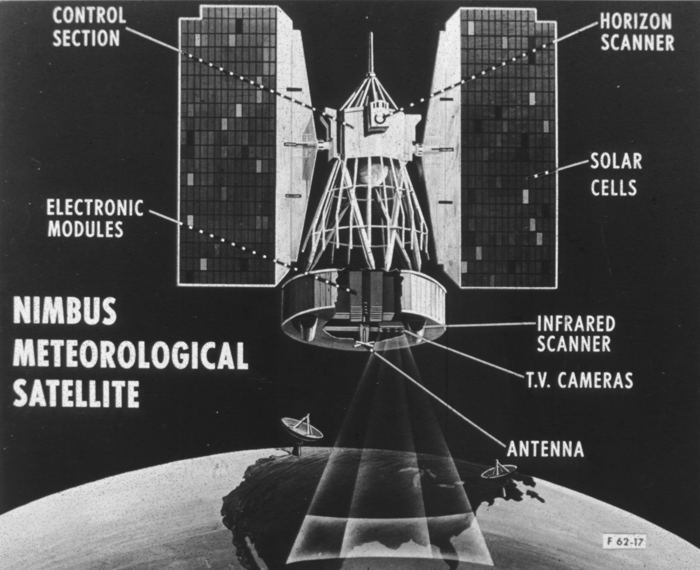
- Design of Nimbus 2
- Mission type: Weather satellite
- Operator: NASA
- COSPAR ID: 1966-040A
- SATCAT no.: 2173
- Mission duration: 2 years and 8 months

Spacecraft properties
- Manufacturer: RCA Astrospace
- Launch mass: 413.70 kilograms (912.1 lb)
- Dimensions: 3.7 m × 1.5 m × 3.0 m (12.1 ft × 4.9 ft × 9.8 ft)

Start of mission
- Launch date: May 15, 1966, 07:55:34 UTC
- Rocket: Thor-SLV2A Agena-B
- Launch site: Vandenberg 75-1-1

End of mission
- Last contact: January 17, 1969

Orbital parameters
- Reference system: Geocentric
- Regime: Low Earth
- Eccentricity: 0.03595
- Perigee altitude: 429 kilometers (267 mi)
- Apogee altitude: 937 kilometers (582 mi)
- Inclination: 98.66°
- Period: 98.42 minutes
- Epoch: August 28, 1964

Nimbus 2 (also called Nimbus-C) was a meteorological satellite. It was the second in a series of the Nimbus program.

== Launch ==
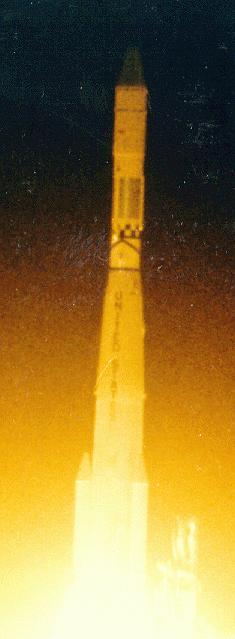
Launch of Nimbus 2

Nimbus 2 was launched on May 15, 1966, by a Thor-Agena rocket from Vandenberg Air Force Base, California, United States. The spacecraft functioned nominally until January 17, 1969. The satellite orbited the Earth once every 1 hour and 48 minutes, at an inclination of 100°. Its perigee was 1,103 kilometers (685 mi) and its apogee was 1,179 kilometers (733 mi).

== Mission ==
The second in a series of second-generation meteorological research and development satellites, Nimbus 2 was designed to serve as a stabilized, Earth-oriented platform for the testing of advanced meteorological sensor systems and the collecting of meteorological data. The polar-orbiting spacecraft consisted of three major elements: (1) a torus-shaped sensory ring, (2) solar paddles, and (3) the control system housing. The solar paddles and control system housing were connected to the sensory ring by a truss structure, giving the satellite the appearance of an ocean buoy.

Nimbus 2 was nearly 3.7 metres (12 ft) tall, 1.5 metres (4.9 ft) in diameter at the base, and about 3 metres (9.8 ft) across with solar paddles extended. The sensory ring, which formed the satellite base, housed the electronics equipment and battery modules. The lower surface of the sensory ring provided mounting space for sensors and telemetry antennas. An H-frame structure mounted within the center of the torus provided support for the larger experiments and tape recorders. Mounted on the control system housing, which was located on top of the spacecraft, were Sun sensors, horizon scanners, gas nozzles for attitude control, and a command antenna.

Use of a stabilization and control system allowed the spacecraft's orientation to be controlled to within plus or minus 1° for all three axes (pitch, roll, yaw). The spacecraft carried:

- Advanced Vidicon Camera System (AVCS): instrument for recording and storing remote cloud cover pictures
- Automatic Picture Transmission (APT): instrument for providing real-time cloud cover pictures
- High and Medium Resolution Infrared Radiometers (HRIR/MRIR): for measuring the intensity and distribution of electromagnetic radiation emitted by and reflected from the Earth and its atmosphere

The Nimbus 2 and experiments performed normally after launch until July 26, 1966, when the spacecraft tape recorder failed. Its function was taken over by the HRIR tape recorder until November 15, 1966, when it also failed. Some real-time data were collected until January 17, 1969, when the spacecraft mission was terminated owing to deterioration of the horizon scanner used for Earth reference.
