= List of storms named Yoling =

The name Yoling was used for two tropical cyclones worldwide, both in the Philippines by the Philippine Weather Bureau, the predecessor of PAGASA.

- Tropical Depression Yoling (1966) – a tropical depression that dissipated over Mindanao.
- Typhoon Patsy (1970) – a destructive and deadly Category 4 super typhoon that struck the Philippines and Vietnam.

The name Yoling was retired after the 1970 season, and was replaced by Yaning in 1974.
