= Nimbus B =

U.S. meteorological satellite, lost in a launch failure

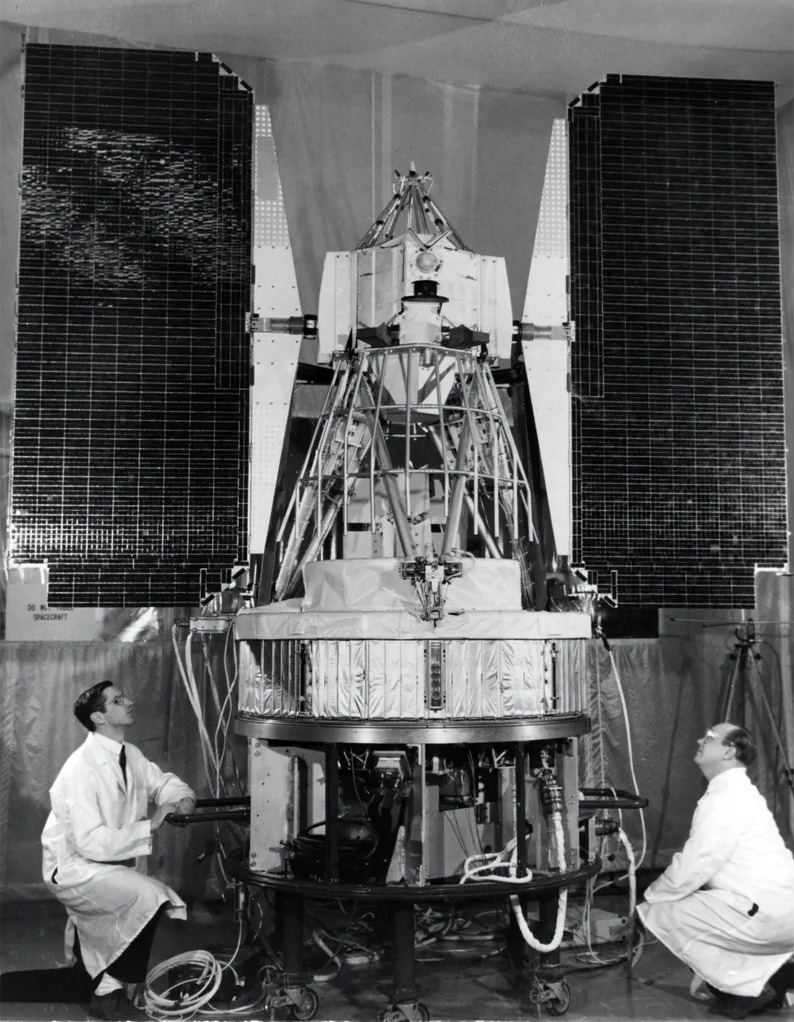
- Mission type: Weather satellite
- Operator: NASA
- COSPAR ID: NIMBS-B
- Mission duration: Launch failure

Spacecraft properties
- Manufacturer: RCA Astrospace
- Launch mass: 571.5 kilograms (1,260 lb)

Start of mission
- Launch date: May 18, 1968, 08:23:00 UTC
- Rocket: Thorad-SLV2G Agena-D
- Launch site: Vandenberg SLC-2E

Orbital parameters
- Reference system: Geocentric
- Regime: Low Earth
- Epoch: Planned

Nimbus B was a meteorological satellite launched as part of the Nimbus program. It was released on May 18, 1968 from the Vandenberg Air Force Base, Lompoc, California, by means of a Thor-Agena launch vehicle, together with the SECOR 10 satellite. Nimbus B never achieved orbit because a malfunction in the booster guidance system forced the destruction of the spacecraft and its payload during launch.

The SNAP-19 Radioisotope Thermoelectric Generator used to power the satellite was salvaged from the water, refurbished and later flown on Nimbus 3.

== Gallery ==
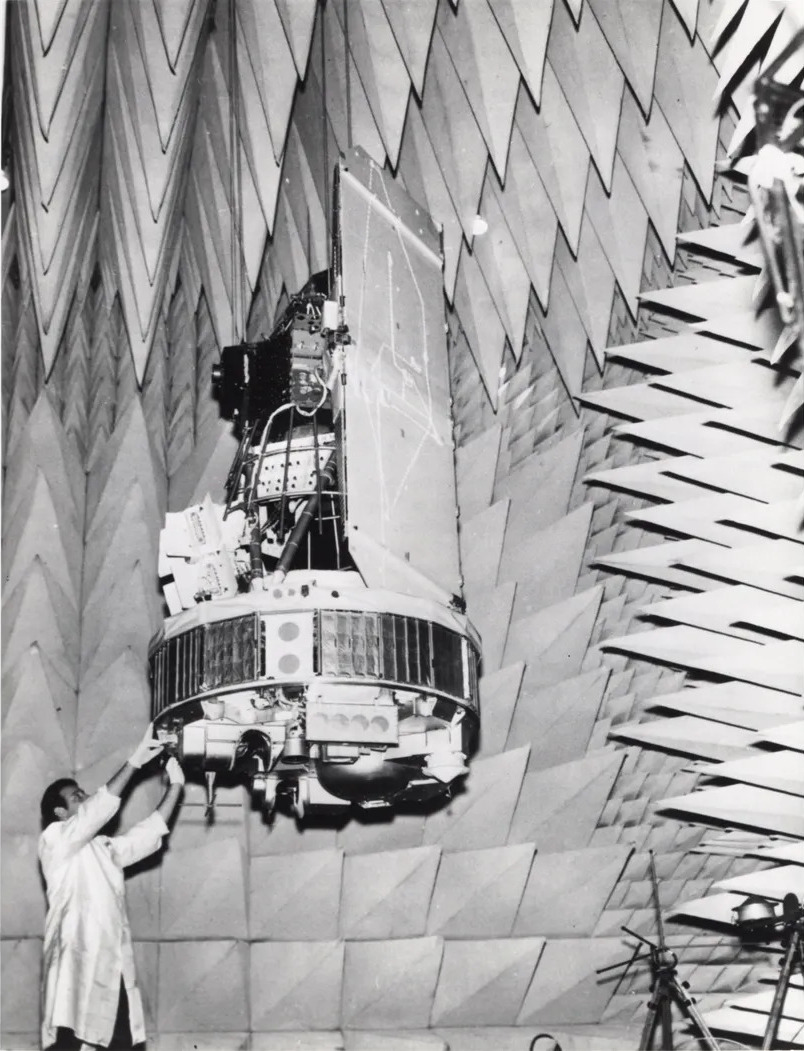
Nimbus B undergoes testing in an echo-free chamber.

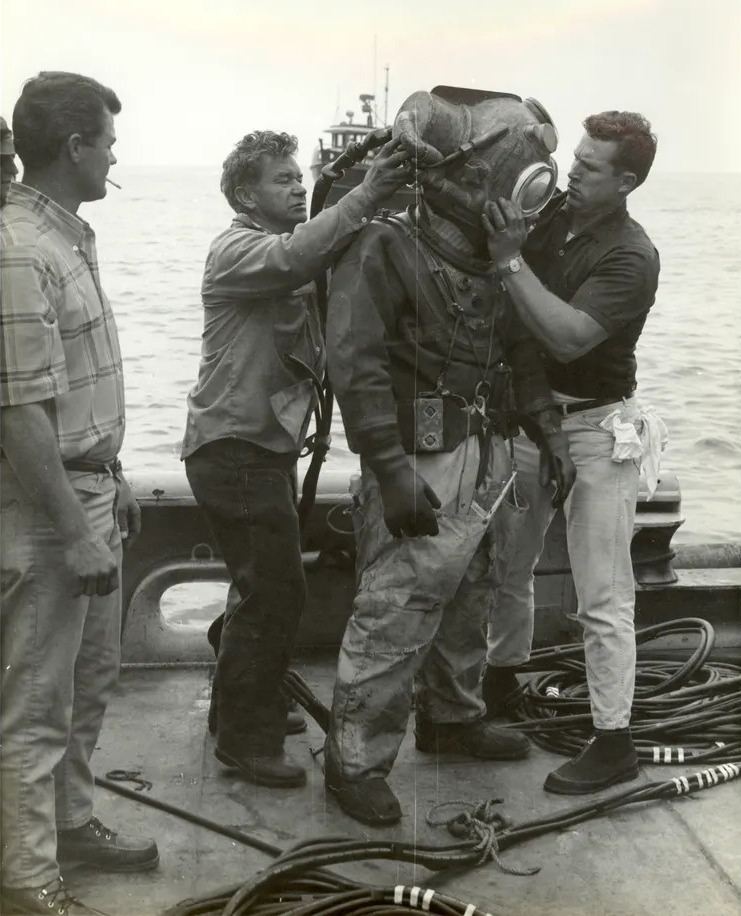
The hunt was on for the Nimbus remains—divers, submarines and navy vessels all scoured the ocean in search of the craft.

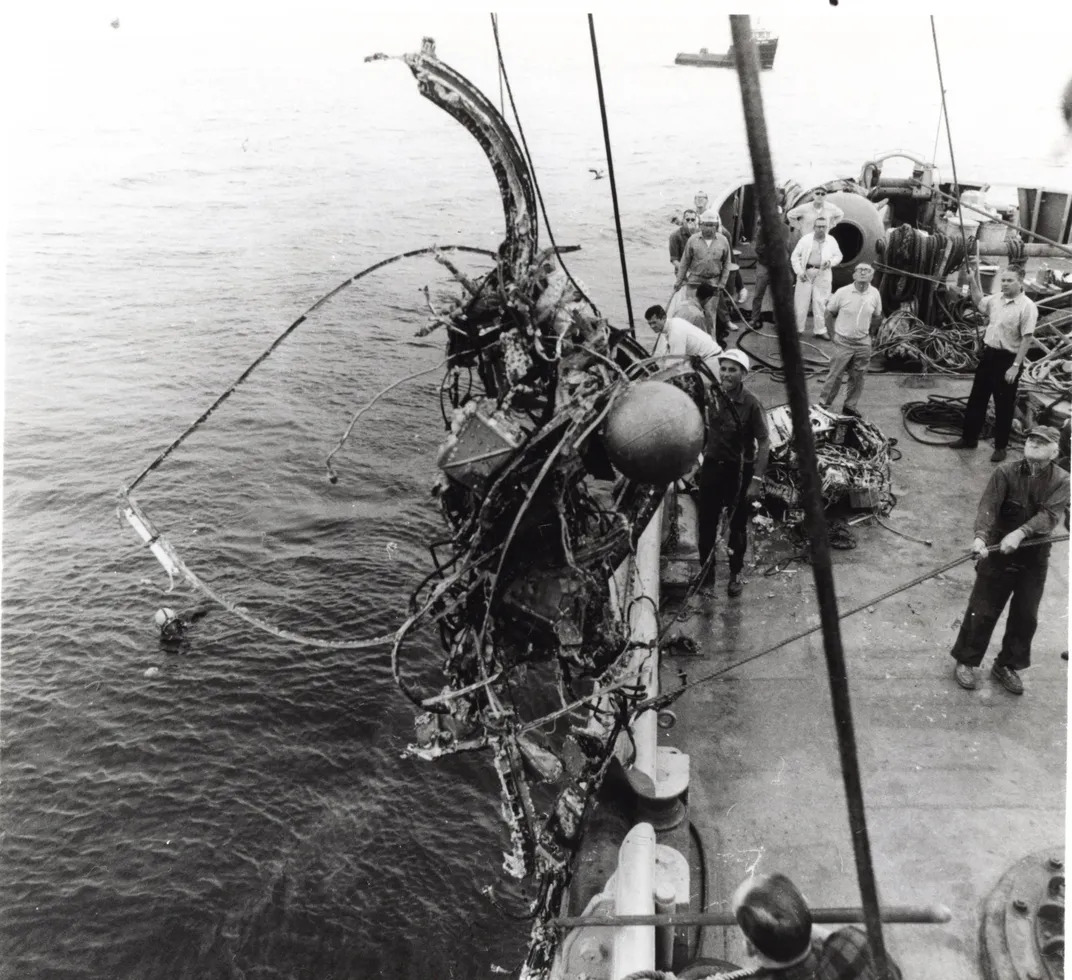
A team of divers and search vessels scoured the Pacific Ocean in search of remains of Nimbus-B.

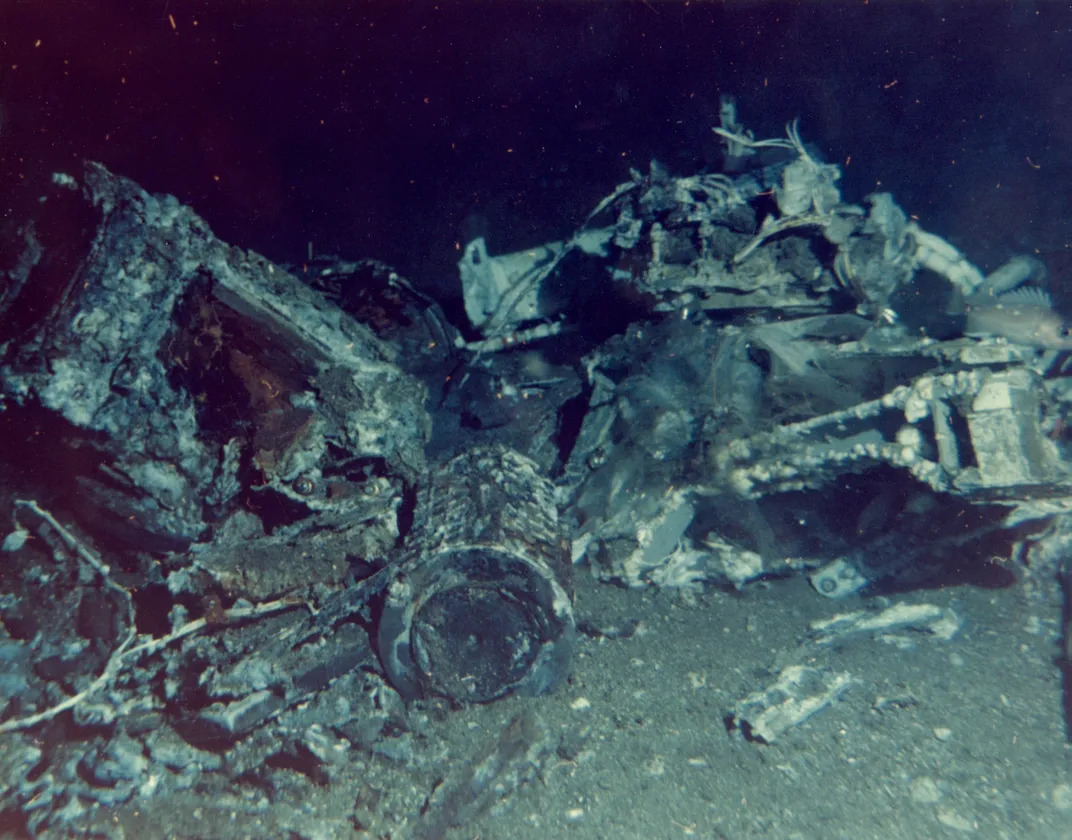
Intact SNAP-19 fuel capsule is shown among debris on Pacific Ocean floor, resulting from the aborted launch of a Nimbus B.

== Instruments ==
- High Data Rate Storage System (DHRSS)
- High and Medium-Resolution Infrared Radiometers (HRIR/MRIR)
- Image Dissector Camera System (IDCS)
- Infrared Interferometer Spectrometer (IRIS)
- Monitor of Ultraviolet Solar Energy (MUSE)
- Radioisotope Thermoelectric Generator (SNAP-19)
- Real-time transmission System (RTTS)
- Satellite Infrared Spectrometer (SIRS)

== See also ==
- Television Infrared Observation Satellite
