= List of storms named Yoning =

The name Yoning has been used to name five tropical cyclones within the Philippine Area of Responsibility by the PAGASA and its predecessor, the Philippine Weather Bureau.

- Typhoon Ruby (1964) (T6420, 25W, Yoning) – a Category 4 typhoon that made landfall near Hong Kong, killed over 758 people with 14 missing.
- Typhoon Marge (1976) (T7623, 27W, Yoning) – a tropical cyclone that was categorized as a typhoon by the JMA.
- Tropical Storm Cary (1980) (T8022, 26W, Yoning) – a tropical storm that hit the Philippines and Vietnam.
- Typhoon Clara (1984) (T8427, 31W, Yoning) – a Category 3 typhoon that had no significant effects on land.
- Typhoon Skip (1988) (T8829, 51W, Yoning) – the third and final typhoon to strike the Philippines within a two-week period, Skip caused ₱3.06 billion in damages with 237 dead and 95 missing.

After the 1988 Pacific typhoon season, the PAGASA retired the name Yoning and replaced it with Yerling.
