= List of storms named Yolanda =

The name Yolanda or Yolande has been used for four tropical cyclones worldwide: one in the Eastern Pacific Ocean, one in the Philippines by PAGASA in the Western Pacific Ocean, and two in the South Pacific Ocean.

In the Eastern Pacific:

- Tropical Storm Yolanda (1992) – remained in the open ocean.

In the Western Pacific:

The name was used for one tropical cyclone in the Philippine Area of Responsibility by PAGASA.

- Typhoon Haiyan (2013) (T1330, 31W, Yolanda) – Category 5 super typhoon, caused massive destruction in the Philippines and in Southern China.

The name Yolanda was retired following the 2013 Pacific typhoon season and was replaced with Yasmin.

The name Yolande has also been used for two tropical cyclone in South Pacific Ocean.

- Cyclone Yolande (1972) – a tropical cyclone that churned in the open South Pacific.
- Cyclone Yolande (2002) – a tropical cyclone that formed east of Tonga.
