= List of storms named Yali =

The name Yali has been used for two tropical cyclones in the South Pacific region of the Southern Hemisphere:

- Cyclone Yali (1987) – a tropical cyclone that passed near New Caledonia and Vanuatu.
- Cyclone Yali (1998) – a Category 3 severe tropical cyclone that affected New Caledonia and Vanuatu as a tropical cyclone, and its remnants killed one person while crossing through New Zealand.
