= List of storms named Yvonne =

The name Yvonne has been used for three tropical cyclones worldwide.

In the Western Pacific:

- Tropical Storm Yvonne (1945) – a tropical storm that formed over the central Philippines and struck Vietnam.

In the Australian Region:

- Cyclone Yvonne (1971) – a tropical storm that formed in the Australian region of the Indian Ocean; renamed Lise when it crossed into the South-West Indian basin.
- Cyclone Yvonne (1974) – a tropical storm that struck Australia's Cape York Peninsula.
