= List of storms named Yuri =

The name Yuri has been used to name two tropical cyclones in the north-western Pacific Ocean.

- Typhoon Yuri (1991) (T9128, 30W) – the strongest storm of the season, and also impacted Guam, the Mariana Islands, and Pohnpei.
- Tropical Storm Yuri (1994) (T9433, 36W) – not a threat to land.
