= List of storms named Yayang =

The name Yayang has been used to name five tropical cyclones in the Philippine Area of Responsibility by the PAGASA and its predecessor, the Philippine Weather Bureau.

- Typhoon Freda (1967) (T6734, 36W, Yayang) – a Category 2-equivalent typhoon that struck Vietnam.
- Typhoon Bess (1971) (T7127, 30W, Yayang) – a Category 5 super typhoon that struck Taiwan and Fujian.
- Super Typhoon Vera (1979) (T7922, 24W, Yayang) – a Category 5 super typhoon that weakened before hitting Luzon.
- Typhoon Percy (1983) (T8320, 21W, Yayang) – a Category 1 typhoon that formed in the South China Sea and interacted with Typhoon Orchid; had mostly minor effects in the Philippines.
- Tropical Storm Wilda (1991) (T9127, 29W, Yayang) – struck the Philippines.

Preceded by Waldo	Pacific typhoon season names Yayang	Succeeded by Zeny
