= Typhoon Yancy (1990) =

Pacific typhoon in 1990

Typhoon Yancy (Gading)
- Typhoon Yancy near peak intensity on August 18

Meteorological history
- Formed: August 11, 1990
- Dissipated: August 23, 1990

Typhoon
- 10-minute sustained (JMA)
- Highest winds: 150 km/h (90 mph)
- Lowest pressure: 950 hPa (mbar); 28.05 inHg

Category 2-equivalent typhoon
- 1-minute sustained (SSHWS/JTWC)
- Highest winds: 165 km/h (105 mph)

Overall effects
- Fatalities: 284
- Injuries: 927
- Missing: 74
- Damage: ~$384 million (1990 USD)
- Areas affected: Philippines, Taiwan, China
- IBTrACS
- Part of the 1990 Pacific typhoon season

Typhoon Yancy, known as Typhoon Gading in the Philippines, was an erratic tropical cyclone that delivered significant impacts in Taiwan and southeastern China in 1990. Originating from an area of disturbed weather within the monsoon trough, it organized into Tropical Storm Yancy on August 14. The system moved westward for several days and slowly gathered strength, becoming a typhoon on August 16 and reaching one-minute peak winds of 165 km/h (105 mph) the next day. Yancy moved erratically as it skirted along the northern coastline of Taiwan and made a subsequent landfall in southeastern China, where it lingered for several days before dissipating on August 23.

The storm capsized two ships offshore the Philippines. In Taiwan, torrential rainfall ruined 9,900 ha (24,400 acres) of crops, caused landslides that disrupted travel, damaged houses, downed trees, and cut power to 525,000 families. In the Fujian, Zhejiang, and Guangdong provinces of China, the cyclone damaged tens of thousands of homes, razed crops, and damaged seawalls. About 400,000 residents were left homeless throughout those locales. Along Yancy's path, 284 people were killed, 74 more were left missing, and over 927 others were injured. Total damage was estimated to be around $384 million (1990 USD).

== Meteorological history ==
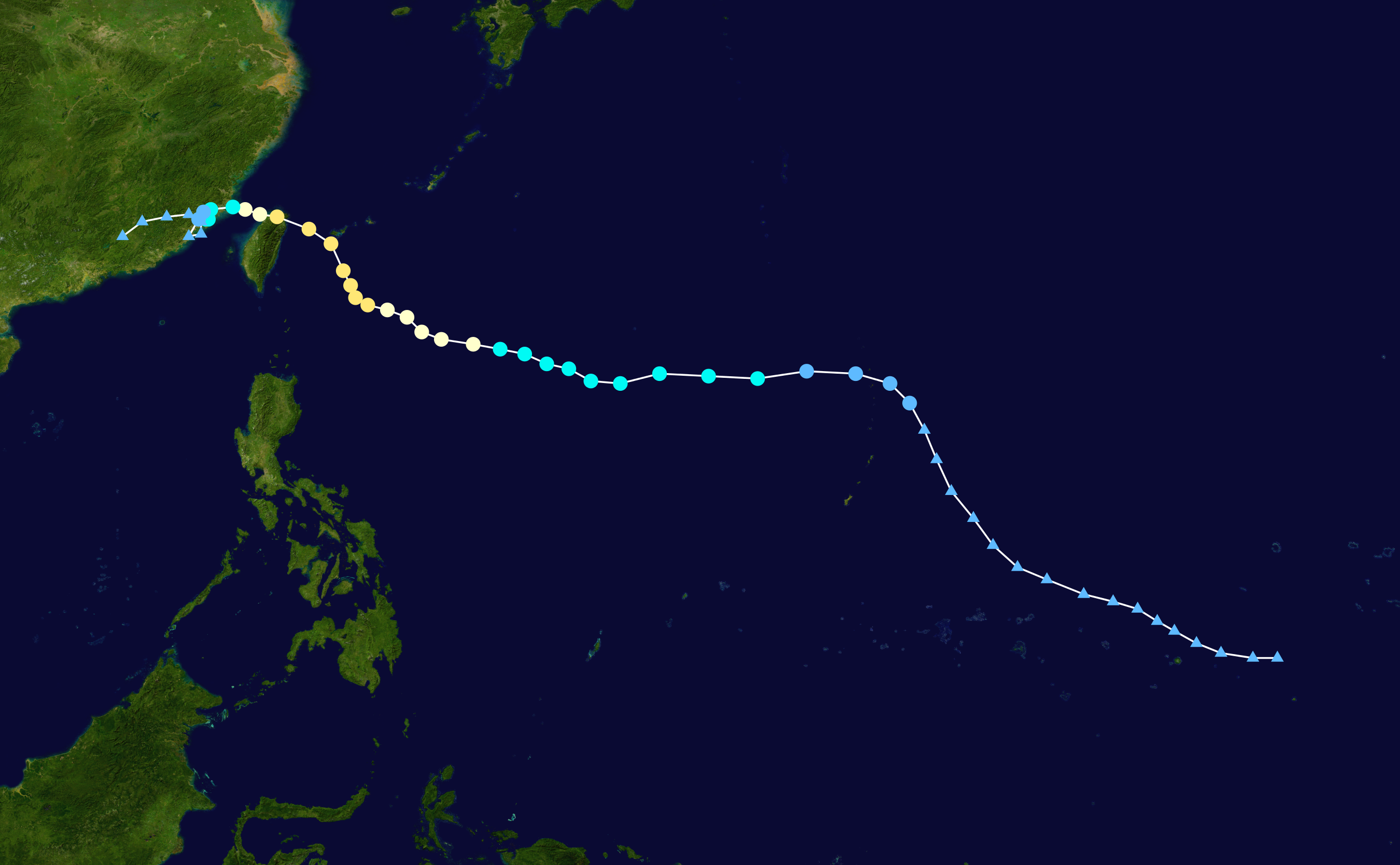
Map plotting the storm's track and intensity, according to the Saffir–Simpson scale Map key Saffir–Simpson scale Tropical depression (≤38 mph, ≤62 km/h) Tropical storm (39–73 mph, 63–118 km/h) Category 1 (74–95 mph, 119–153 km/h) Category 2 (96–110 mph, 154–177 km/h) Category 3 (111–129 mph, 178–208 km/h) Category 4 (130–156 mph, 209–251 km/h) Category 5 (≥157 mph, ≥252 km/h) Unknown Storm type Tropical cyclone Subtropical cyclone Extratropical cyclone, remnant low, tropical disturbance, or monsoon depression

At 06:00 UTC on August 9, Yancy was first noted by the Joint Typhoon Warning Center (JTWC) in a Significant Tropical Weather Advisory as an area of persistent convection. (Note: The Joint Typhoon Warning Center is a joint United States Navy – United States Air Force task force that issues tropical cyclone warnings for the western Pacific Ocean and other regions.) What eventually developed into Typhoon Yancy initially began as a low-level convective center on the eastern side of a monsoon depression. For a period lasting four days, multiple vortices persisted at low latitudes prior to their ultimate consolidation into Yancy. During its early stages of formation, Yancy moved in an inconsistent manner as mesoscale convective elements developed and decayed, and up until August 13, Yancy adopted a steady westward track. During this period, the JTWC issued three Tropical Cyclone Formation Alerts (TCFAs). The Japan Meteorological Agency (JMA), meanwhile, began monitoring the system on August 11. (Note: The Japan Meteorological Agency is the official Regional Specialized Meteorological Center for the western Pacific Ocean.)

Of the aforementioned TCFAs, the first was issued at 21:00 UTC on August 11 based on the improving state of the disturbance's central convection and upper-level outflow coupled with decreasing barometric pressure at multiple nearby stations on land. A second alert was issued at 14:00 UTC the following day in response to a northward shift of a low-level center and further decreases in surface pressure. The third and final TCFA was issued at 14:00 UTC on August 13 as the system continued to organize. Four hours later, the JTWC issued its first warning on the newly upgraded tropical depression. It was upgraded to Tropical Storm Yancy at 12:00 UTC August 14 based on increased curvature of convection and consolidation of the cyclonic center, though the JMA assessed this upgrade twelve hours sooner. Beyond August 13, Yancy continued to follow a westward track, but it did so at a quicker pace. This period of rapid movement lasted for two days as the storm moved under the influence of an intensifying subtropical ridge to the north. At 12:00 UTC on August 16, the JTWC determined that Yancy had strengthened into a typhoon.

Yancy's trajectory shifted from westward to north-northwestward after the subtropical ridge weakened in response to a shortwave trough moving off the coast of China. The typhoon continued to move in this direction for eighteen hours; beyond this point, the subtropical ridge re-strengthened and Yancy continued its westward trajectory. According to JTWC data, Yancy intensified into the equivalent of a Category 2 on the Saffir–Simpson scale at 18:00 UTC on August 17, peaking in intensity six hours later with one-minute sustained winds of 90 knots (165 km/h; 105 mph). JMA data, however, placed Yancy's peak intensity eighteen hours later, with ten-minute sustained winds of 80 knots (150 km/h; 90 mph) and a minimum barometric pressure of 28.05 inHg (950 mbar). On August 18, just as the cyclone was peaking in intensity, it developed an eye. Yancy then proceeded to carry out a trochoidal oscillation, tracking across Taiwan the next day. Yancy's interaction with mountainous terrain on the island, and later China, caused it to weaken. JMA data reflects this weakening, with Yancy's winds decreasing to severe tropical storm intensity at 18:00 UTC August 19 and tropical storm intensity twelve hours later. The JTWC downgraded Yancy to a tropical storm at 00:00 UTC August 20; thirty hours later, the agency downgraded the storm to a tropical depression, simultaneously issuing its final warning and declaring Yancy dissipated. The JMA similarly found that Yancy had weakened to a tropical depression on August 22, and it stopped tracking the system the next day.

== Impacts ==
In the Philippines where Yancy was known by the PAGASA name "Gading", (Note: The Philippine Atmospheric, Geophysical and Astronomical Services Administration (PAGASA) independently names storms within its area of responsibility which is approximately 115°E to 135°E and 5°N to 25°N.), a monsoon surge triggered by the storm resulted in significant rainfall which flooded areas across northern Luzon. Over 60,000 residents fled to evacuation centers. Offshore, two ships capsized in rough seas generated by the storm's large circulation. Six people were killed, four people were reported missing, and eight people were injured in the marine accidents.

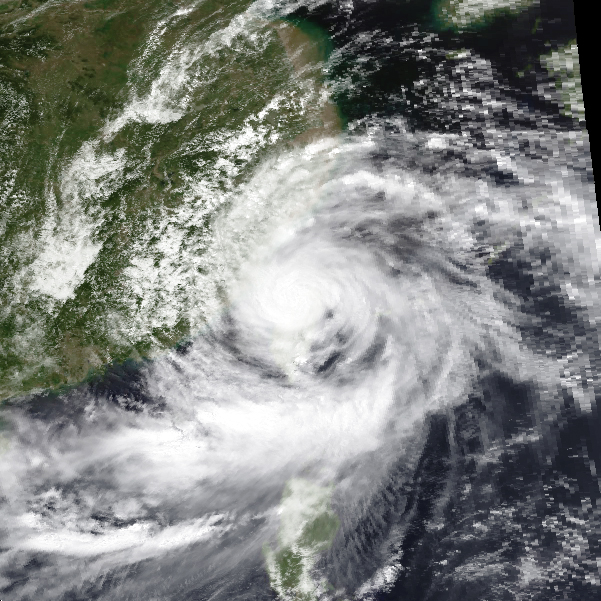
Yancy over Taiwan on August 19

To the north in Taiwan, heavy rains up to 1,194 mm (47.0 in) in the Alishan Range and 718.5 mm (28.29 in) on Yu Shan were recorded. These rains caused extensive flooding that washed away 9,900 ha (24,400 acres) of rice, vegetable, and fruit plantations. The combination of floods and landslides caused many railways and roads to be blocked with hundreds of trees being uprooted. One house was collapsed and seven other homes were damaged by the storm. In Taipei alone, about 525,000 families lost power. In the Port of Keelung, one fishing vessel capsized and a 31,600 ton ship Livi was run aground. The severe weather shut down Taoyuan International Airport for two days. In total, thirteen people were killed across the island, with seven people being reported missing after being washed away by floods, and fourteen others were injured from falling objects. Five of these deaths occurred when five cars were swept off a bridge; additional fatalities occurred either by flying signs and debris or as a result of electrocution by downed power lines. Total damage across Taiwan was estimated at NT$2.7 billion. Also 18 people died after a Republic of China Air Force Beechcraft 1900C-1 lost control and crashed in Yunlin County, due to the adverse weather caused by the typhoon.

Yancy delivered significant impact to southeastern China. In Fujian, where the cyclone meandered for days and contributed to more than 610 mm (24 in), more than 4 million residents were directly affected. More than 40,000 houses were damaged or destroyed, and 157 boats were swept away. About 171,300 ha (423,000 acres) of farmland were inundated by flooding, of which 40,000 ha (100,000 acres) occurred in Fuqing County alone. Up to 237 km (147 mi) of communication lines were damaged. Additional damage was inflicted to 447 bridges and 20,000 sites of irrigation works. The total cost was estimated at $900 million RMB. The storm killed 161 people and injured 468 more in that province, many of whom died in collapsed buildings. In neighboring Zhejiang, about 20,700 homes were damaged. The hardest hit locale was Wenzhou, where approximately 99,000 ha (240,000 acres) of land suffered extensive flooding, and where grain losses amounted to 20,000 tons. Total damage was estimated at $450 million RMB. A total of 96 people were killed, 63 others were reported missing, and more than 400 more were injured. An additional 7,800 heads of livestock were killed as well. Throughout both the Fujian and Zhejiang provinces, seawalls and dikes were damaged. In the two months leading up to Yancy's impact, the region had been struck by four typhoons. In eastern Guangdong, the effects of the storm, chiefly from heavy rainfall, collapsed 4,800 homes and inundated about 89,000 ha (220,000 acres) of farmland. Eight people were killed and another thirty-seven people were injured. Throughout the entirety of southeastern China, 400,000 residents were left homeless.

== See also ==
- Other tropical cyclones named Yancy
- Typhoon Abe (1990)
