= List of storms named Yagi =

The name Yagi (Japanese: ヤギ, [ja̠ɡʲi]) was used for five tropical cyclones in the Western Pacific Ocean. The name was contributed by Japan and refers to the constellation Capricornus, the goat, in Japanese.

- Typhoon Yagi (2000) (T0019, 29W, Paring) – a relatively strong typhoon that impacted the Ryukyu Islands and threatened Taiwan before dissipating.
- Typhoon Yagi (2006) (T0614, 16W) – the strongest typhoon of the 2006 season in terms of pressure which eventually did not threaten significant land areas.
- Tropical Storm Yagi (2013) (T1303, 03W, Dante) – a tropical storm that brought minor impacts to the Philippines and Japan.
- Tropical Storm Yagi (2018) (T1814, 18W, Karding) – a weak tropical storm that affected the Philippines, Ryukyu Islands, Taiwan and East China.
- Typhoon Yagi (2024) (T2411, 12W, Enteng) – a Category 5-super typhoon that ravaged Indochina, Hainan and the Philippines.

The name Yagi was retired following the 2024 Pacific typhoon season and was replaced with Tomo (Japanese: トモ, [to̞mo̞]), which refers to the constellation Puppis, the stern deck, in Japanese.

== See also ==
- Cyclone Yali (1998) – a South Pacific tropical cyclone with a similar name
