= List of storms named Yunya =

The name Yunya has been used to name two tropical cyclones in the western north Pacific:

- Typhoon Yunya (1991) (T9105, 05W, Diding) – passed over the Philippines during the eruption of Mount Pinatubo
- Tropical Storm Yunya (1994) (T9409, 11W, Norming) – a small system that passed near the Philippines
