= List of storms named Yutu =

The name Yutu (Mandarin: 玉兔, [y˥˩ tʰu˥˩]) has been used to name four tropical cyclones in the northwestern Pacific Ocean. The name was contributed by China and refers to the legend of the Jade Rabbit in Mandarin.

- Severe Tropical Storm Yutu (2001) (T0107, 10W, Huaning) – a Category 2 equivalent typhoon from JTWC, which impacted China.
- Typhoon Yutu (2007) (T0702, 02W, Amang) – not a threat to land.
- Tropical Storm Yutu (2013) (T1316) – Recognized as a tropical storm only by the JMA; the JTWC instead classified it as a subtropical depression.
- Typhoon Yutu (2018) (T1826, 31W, Rosita) - A Category 5 super typhoon which devastated the Mariana Islands and the Philippines.

The name Yutu was retired after the 2018 Pacific typhoon season and was replaced with Yinxing (Mandarin: 银杏, [in˧˥ ɕiŋ˥˩]), which means ginkgo tree in Mandarin.

- Typhoon Yinxing (2024) (T2422, 24W, Marce) – A Category 4 super typhoon which impacted the Philippines before later affecting Vietnam.
