= List of storms named Yancy =

The name Yancy has been used for two tropical cyclones in the northwestern Pacific Ocean.

- Typhoon Yancy (1990), a Category 2 typhoon that affected Taiwan, China, and the Philippines
- Typhoon Yancy (1993), a Category 4 typhoon that struck Japan
