= Tropical Storm Yagi (2018) =

Pacific tropical storm in 2018

Tropical Storm Yagi (Karding)
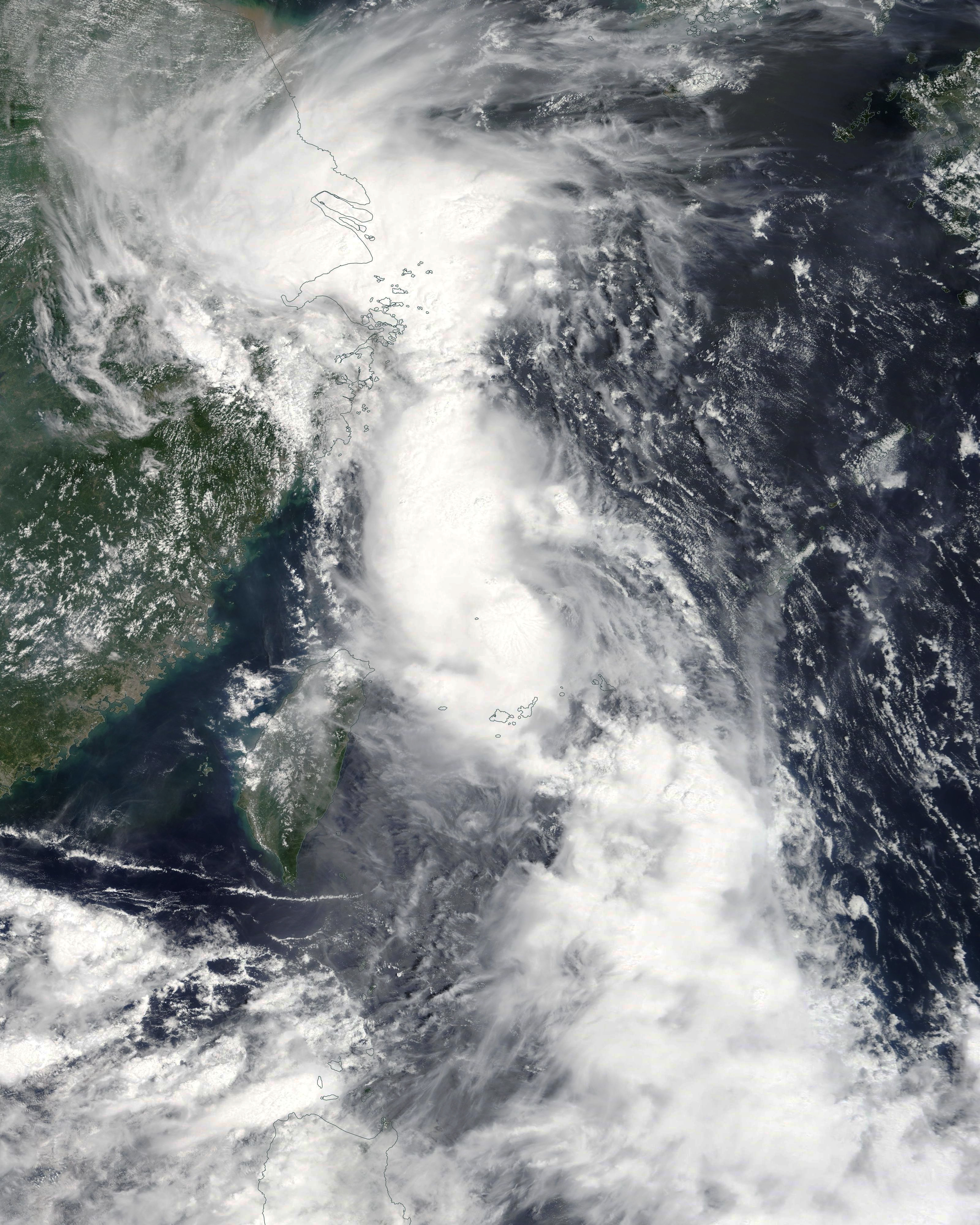
- Tropical Storm Yagi approaching China on August 12

Meteorological history
- Formed: August 6, 2018
- Extratropical: August 15, 2018
- Dissipated: August 16, 2018

Tropical storm
- 10-minute sustained (JMA)
- Highest winds: 75 km/h (45 mph)
- Lowest pressure: 990 hPa (mbar); 29.23 inHg

Tropical storm
- 1-minute sustained (SSHWS/JTWC)
- Highest winds: 85 km/h (50 mph)
- Lowest pressure: 983 hPa (mbar); 29.03 inHg

Overall effects
- Fatalities: 8 total
- Missing: 8
- Damage: $19.7 million (2018 USD)
- Economic losses: $379 million (2018 USD)
- Areas affected: China, Taiwan, Philippines, Japan, Korea
- IBTrACS
- Part of the 2018 Pacific typhoon season

Tropical Storm Yagi, (Note: The name Yagi (Japanese: ヤギ, [ja̠ɡʲi]) was contributed by Japan and refers to the constellation Capricornus, the goat, in Japanese.) known in the Philippines as Tropical Storm Karding, was a moderate but damaging tropical cyclone of the 2018 Pacific typhoon season. The storm originated on July 31 as a tropical disturbance southwest of Iwo To. The system intensified into a tropical depression on August 6 after several days of being over favorable conditions while moving westward, while PAGASA gave it the local name Karding. Though it was disorganized mainly due to moderate vertical wind shear, excellent outflow allowed the storm to intensify, and by August 8, it strengthened into a tropical storm, receiving the name Yagi. The storm moved erratically before steering northwestward on August 9, as thunderstorms broadened close to the center. Continuing to battle vertical wind shear, the storm deviated and turned west on August 11, before resuming its northwestward path. That day, Yagi attained maximum sustained winds of 75 km/h (45 mph) and a lowest barometric pressure of 990 hPa (29.23 inHg). While north-northeast of Taipei, Taiwan on August 12, the Joint Typhoon Warning Center assessed that Yagi reached maximum 1-minute winds of 100 km/h (65 mph). The storm then made landfall over Wenling, Zhejiang, leading to rapid weakening from land interaction. Yagi recurved eastward on August 14 into the Bohai Sea, where it transitioned into an extratropical cyclone on August 15, and dissipated the next day.

In the Ryukyu Islands, strong winds were recorded and flights were disrupted, and in Miyakojima, the island experienced "once-in-50-years" rainfall. Yagi enhanced the southwest monsoon over the Philippines, pouring heavy rain over several regions of Luzon. The storm damaged 3,379 homes and left Metro Manila littered with trash. Swollen rivers led to impassable roads, and in ports, 193 people were left stranded. The storm killed five people throughout the country, most of which died from drowning, and left eight missing. Overall, damage in the Philippines totaled ₱996.001 million (US$18.913 million). In China, Yagi brought strong gales during landfall, and flooded many rivers and tributaries. Heavy winds and storm surge damaged much of Jinshan City Beach and caused a signboard in East Nanjing Road to kill three people and injure six. Yagi also produced the first ever tornado outbreak in modern Chinese history, causing property and agricultural damage, leading to an economic loss of up to CN¥2.51 billion (US$379.383 million). Elsewhere, the Korea Meteorological Administration expected Yagi to make landfall along the China–North Korea border and bring much needed rain to alleviate a deadly heat wave, though the storm turned away from the area.

== Meteorological history ==
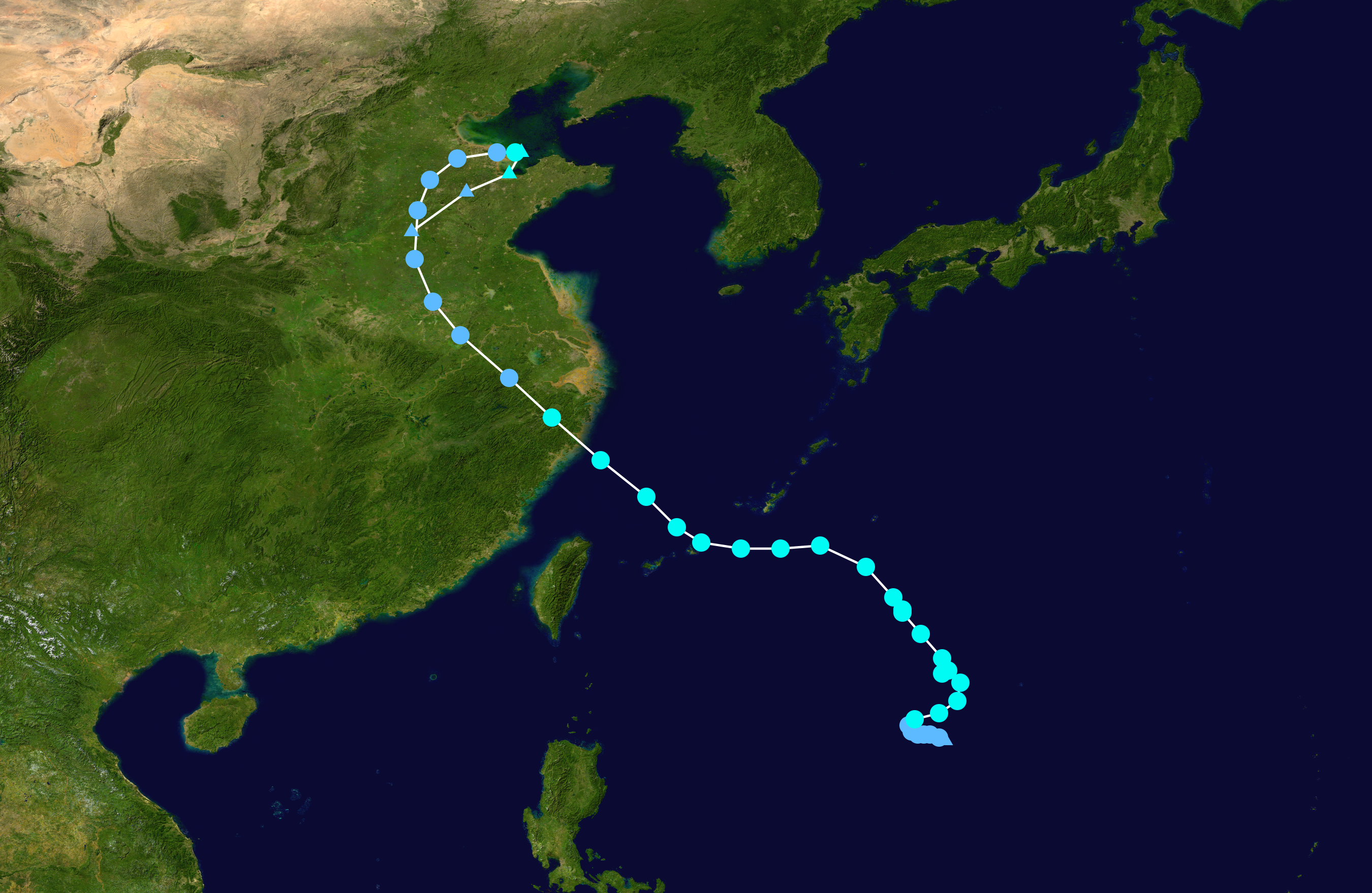
Map plotting the storm's track and intensity, according to the Saffir–Simpson scale Map key Saffir–Simpson scale Tropical depression (≤38 mph, ≤62 km/h) Tropical storm (39–73 mph, 63–118 km/h) Category 1 (74–95 mph, 119–153 km/h) Category 2 (96–110 mph, 154–177 km/h) Category 3 (111–129 mph, 178–208 km/h) Category 4 (130–156 mph, 209–251 km/h) Category 5 (≥157 mph, ≥252 km/h) Unknown Storm type Tropical cyclone Subtropical cyclone Extratropical cyclone, remnant low, tropical disturbance, or monsoon depression

Yagi's origins are traced back to July 31, when it formed as a tropical disturbance near 18.0°N 136.0°E. On August 1, the Joint Typhoon Warning Center (JTWC) began monitoring the disturbance that persisted 806 km (501 mi) southwest of Iwo To. The system had a broad area of low level clouds circulating below flaring thunderstorms—or atmospheric convection—possessing adequate divergence aloft and situating over warm sea surface temperatures of 28–29 °C (82–84 °F) and low vertical wind shear—conditions which are favorable for tropical cyclogenesis. At 06:00 UTC, the Japan Meteorological Agency (JMA) recognized it as a low-pressure area, before deeming it too weak early the next day. The JMA then categorized it again on August 4, before last noting it for the second time until August 5 as it was nearly stationary. By August 6, the JMA reported that the system had intensified into a tropical depression east of the Philippines and had begun moving westward. PAGASA had also begun tracking the system as it was within its responsibility area, giving it the local name Karding. At 18:00 UTC of that day, the JTWC designated the system Tropical Depression 18W, though it was characterized as having a poorly defined center and being unorganized.

During August 7, the system began forming rainbands into its fully exposed center, though its convection was displaced to the west by an increase of wind shear. Its motion was influenced by a weak near-equatorial ridge it binded with to the southeast. However, the wind shear was somewhat offset by diffluence in the upper troposphere, allowing deep convection to intensify, as multiple mesovortices in the center were apparent on satellite imagery. As it continued to battle vertical wind shear with equatorward outflow, the system moved erratically in a north-northwestward direction while 948 km (589 mi) south-southeast of Kadena Air Base, Japan. By 00:00 UTC of August 8, the JMA reported that the tropical depression had intensified into a tropical storm, assigning it the name Yagi. The JTWC followed suit in upgrading the system six hours later due to a scatterometer pass, as Yagi turned east-northeast due to being in between the near-equatorial ridge and a subtropical ridge. On August 9, Yagi again turned north-northwestward along the southwestern edge of the subtropical ridge, with thunderstorms beginning to bloom very close to the center. Later on, a dense overcast partially obscures the center over marginal environmental conditions, as outflow continued to improve. Despite sea surface temperatures remaining high, Yagi was over a region of low ocean heat.

On August 10, Yagi briefly became nearly stationary while slowly moving west-southwestward, with convection concentrated over the southwest quadrant, though it resumed its original northwestward track. Nascent thunderstorms then began broadening over the western flank of the storm, despite persistent high wind shear. Moreover, radar imagery revealed fragmented deep banding wrapping into the storm's center as it shifted westward. Around 01:00 UTC on August 11, PAGASA reported that Yagi had exited the Philippine Area of Responsibility. At 12:00 UTC, the JMA reported that Yagi had attained its peak intensity, estimating maximum sustained winds of 75 km/h (45 mph) and the lowest atmospheric pressure of 990 hPa (29.23 inHg). A tropical upper tropospheric trough cell to the north-northwest enhanced poleward outflow, allowing for additional intensification in conjunction with warm waters. At 12:00 UTC in August 12, the JTWC reported that Yagi had attained 1-minute maximum sustained winds of 85 km/h (50 mph) while 285 km (177 mi) north-northeast of Taipei, Taiwan. At 15:35 UTC, Yagi made landfall over the coast of Wenling, Zhejiang, China, prompting the JTWC to issue its final warning at 18:00 UTC. Yagi then began to weaken during August 13 due to land interaction. At 00:00 UTC, Yagi had weaken into a tropical depression, according to the JMA and JTWC. The system then recurved eastward on August 14 and entered the Bohai Sea—where it transitioned into an extratropical cyclone at 06:00 UTC of August 15—turning southward and then southwestward before fully dissipating 24 hours later on August 16.

== Effects ==
=== Philippines ===
Due to the enhancement of the southwest monsoon by Yagi (Karding), orange rainfall alerts—the second highest alert indicating possible rainfall of 15 to 30 mm (0.59 to 1.18 in) per hour—were issued for Metro Manila and Rizal on August 11, before they were upgraded to red rainfall alerts—the highest alert indicating possible rainfall of over 30 mm (1.2 in) per hour. Orange rainfall alerts were then raised across Zambales, Bataan, Bulacan, and Pampanga that same day, and extended to Batangas and Cavite on August 12. A total of 435 cities or municipalities across Metro Manila, the Ilocos Region, Central Luzon, and Calabarzon suspended classes. About 143,833 people sheltered across 487 evacuation centers. With waves expecting to reach 2.6 m (8.5 ft) to 4.5 m (15 ft), a gale warning was issued for Batanes, the Calayan Islands, the Babuyan Islands, Ilocos Norte, Ilocos Sur, La Union, Pangasinan, Zambales, Bataan, Cavite, the western coast of Batangas, Occidental Mindoro, and northern Palawan. PAGASA noted that sea travel was risky in the western seaboard of Luzon. Additionally, the agency released nine severe weather bulletins and 17 warnings for ships. No Tropical Cyclone Wind Signals due to the storm were issued throughout its lifespan.

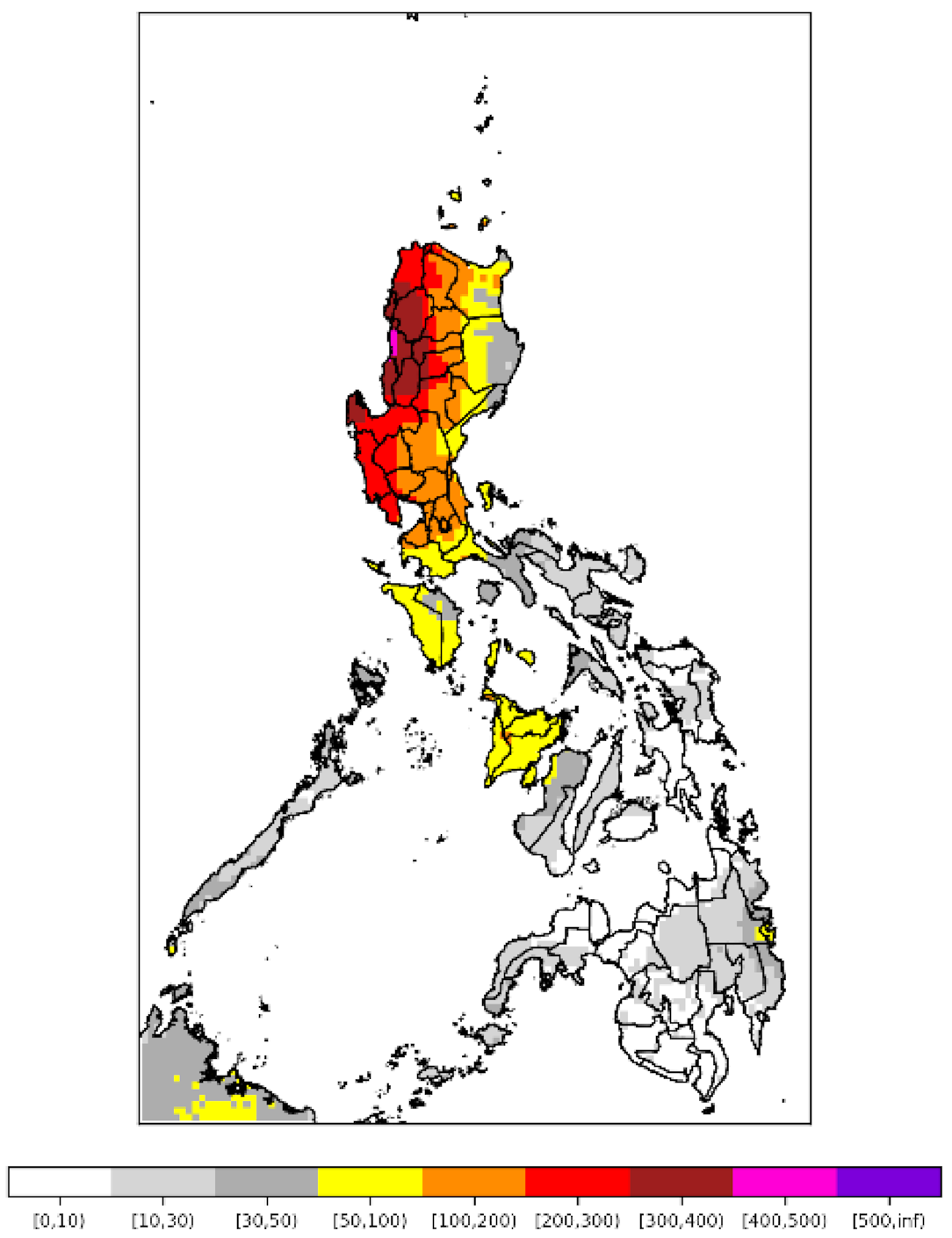
Maximum rainfall (mm) estimated for the storm duration of August 6–11

Throughout the country, the southwest monsoon enhanced by Yagi killed five people and left eight missing. The National Disaster Risk Reduction and Management Council (NDRRMC) reported two deaths and three people missing; a man from Marikina and a woman from Quezon City drowned, two men were swept away by strong current and waves in Quezon City and La Union, and a woman went missing after being a victim of one of the 30 landslides that occurred. About 1.756 million people were affected, with 257,591 of them displaced. The storm affected 111 road sections and one bridge, with 95 of them remaining passable. As of 23 August 2018, a total of 75 areas experieneced power outages, with 65 of them having power restored. About 3,379 homes were damaged across the Ilocos Region, Central Luzon, Calabarzon, and the Cordillera Region (CAR), with 515 of them being totally destroyed. Damage to infrastructure reached ₱952.290 million (US$18.083 million) and damage to agriculture reached ₱43.711 million (US$830,043.46). Total rainfall of 300–500 mm (12–20 in) occurred over Ilocos Sur, while 50 mm (2.0 in) of rain poured over most of Luzon and Mindoro and several provinces throughout the Philippines. The highest 24-hour total rainfall was recorded at Quezon City at 270.1 mm (10.63 in), while the highest total rainfall throughout the storm duration occurred at Baguio at 453.0 mm (17.83 in).

In Pasuquin, a damaged seawall threatened six houses due to big waves. Houses were flooded in Baguio and Abra in the CAR. In the former, ripraps eroded and a wall collapsed. Soil erosion also occurred in Baguio along with Benguet and Kalinga. A bridge in Rizal was damaged by heavy rain, though it was repaired by the local community. Streams and creeks in Abra swelled, leading to impassable roads and isolated barangays. Areas in Metro Manila were flooded, and the region was littered with plastic waste and trash from Manila Bay. In ports across Camarines Sur, Batangas, Oriental Mindoro, Occidental Mindoro, Romblon, and Northern Quezon, 193 passengers, five vessels, and 30 pump boats were left stranded. Seventy percent of Marikina was submerged in floods. Four dams in Northern Luzon released excess water. In San Mateo, 80% of the city was flooded, leading to a state of calamity. Additional fatalities also occurred; a farmer in Tuba, Benguet fell in a drainage canal and drowned. A person in Pulilan was reported to have died from leptospirosis due to floodwaters. In Olongapo, six children jumped into a swollen river; one of them died while the others remained missing.

In the aftermath, the municipalities of Santo Tomas, Sasmuan, and Guagua in Pampanga, the province of Bulacan, Rodriguez and San Mateo in Rizal, and Lacub in Abra, all declared a state of calamity. The NDRRMC reported that about ₱125.297 million (US$2.379 million) worth of relief goods and assistance was provided across six regions, mostly from the Department of Social Welfare and Development, with the Office of Civil Defense, local government units, non-governmental organizations, and other sources also providing aid. Food packs, sleeping kits, and medicine were distributed among affected families.

=== China ===
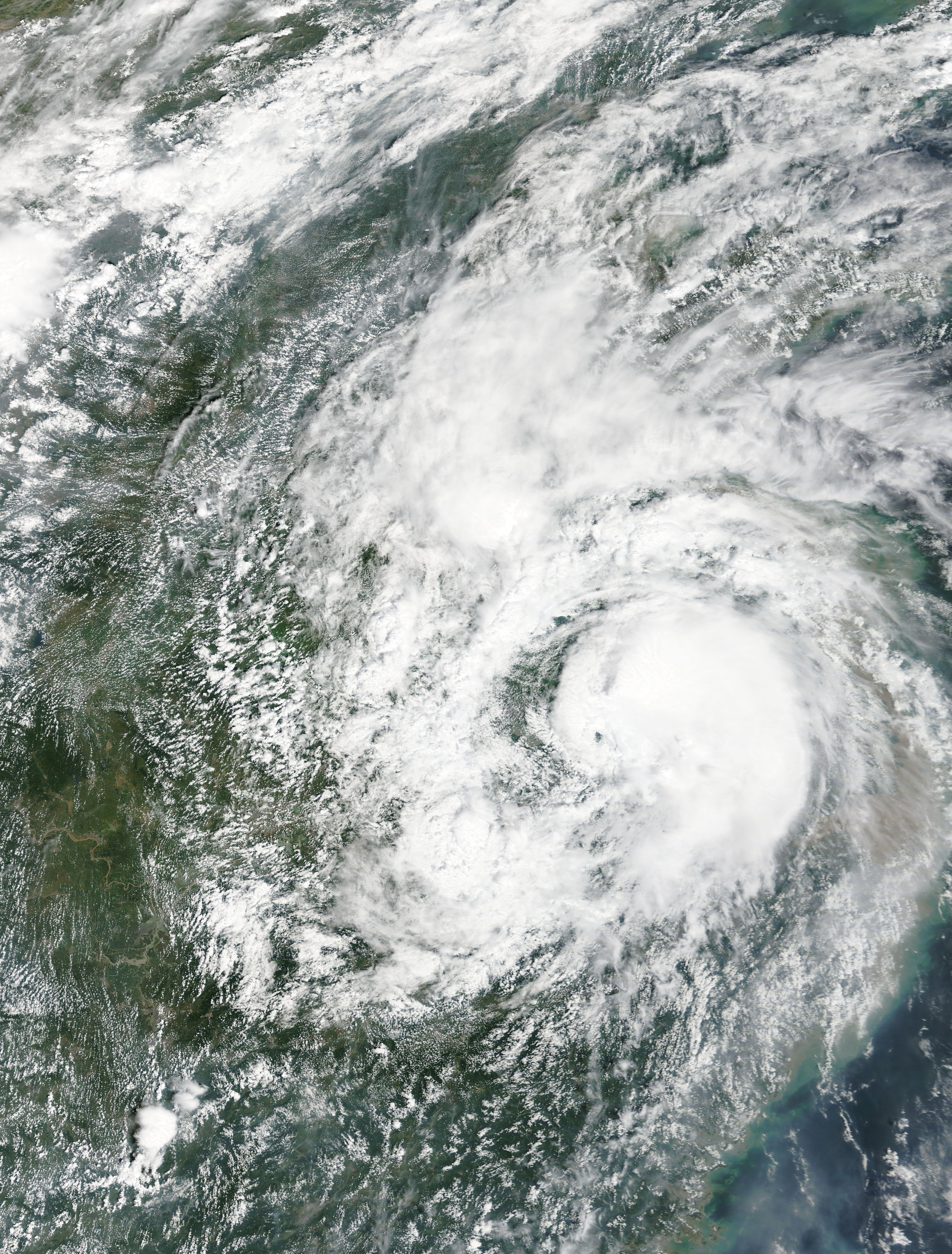
Tropical Depression Yagi over East China on August 13

As Yagi approached the Chinese coast, the National Meteorological Center of the China Meteorological Administration (CMA) issued a blue alert—the first level in a four-tier warning system. Later that day, the CMA upgraded the signal to a yellow alert, the second level. The National Meteorological Center forecasted that from August 13 to 14, the northeastern East China Sea, southwestern Yellow Sea, the coastal regions of Jiangsu and Shanghai, Hangzhou Bay, northern coastal regions of Zhejiang, the western coastal regions of Guangdong, and eastern coastal regions of Hainan would experience force 7-8 gales. Additionally, heavy rain was expected across southern Shandong, eastern Henan, western Jiangsu, central-northern and southeastern Anhui, northwestern Zhejiang, southern Guangdong, and most of Hainan. About 204,949 people across ten cities including Taizhou, Zhoushan, and Wenzhou in Zhejiang were evacuated. A total of 20,949 fishing boats and 4,526 other vessels returned to their ports for safety. In Shanghai, 20 parks were closed, 100 trains were suspended and 149 flights were canceled at Pudong Airport and 143 were canceled at Hongqiao Airport. In Hong Kong, the region's meteorological agency raised a typhoon signal No. 1, as Yagi neared the region.

During landfall, Yagi brought force 10 gales or 102 km/h (63 mph) at its center. Affecting a population of approximately 237,300, Yagi produced rainfall up to 100–200 mm (3.9–7.9 in) over eastern and northern Zhejiang, northeastern Anhui, northwest Jiangsu, central west Shandong, and southern and eastern Hebei. 250–380 mm (9.8–15.0 in) of rain poured over Lu'an and Anqing of Anhui, Xuzhou of Jiangsu, Weifang of Shandong, and Cangzhou of Hebei. In Jiawang District, 443 mm (17.4 in) of rain was recorded. Force 7-9 gusts on the Beaufort scale swept along the eastern coast of China, with Yagi's remnants also producing gusts of the same strength along the coast of Bohai Bay, northeastern Shandong, eastern Hebei, and southern Liaoning. The flooding overflowed the Zhuxi River and the river network of Hangja Lake, Shuihe River, and nine other medium and small rivers, including the Dayang and Biliu Rivers. Jinshan City Beach sustained serious damage, leading to its closure for at least two weeks. Heavy winds and storm surge caused around 90% of the beach's structures and facilities to be damaged. A signboard fell off a shop in East Nanjing Road due to strong winds, killing three people and injuring six. Sixteen people lifted the sign off of the victims. Yagi produced a tornado outbreak, the first ever in modern Chinese history, of 11 tornadoes, after dry air and an approaching mid-latitude trough in the middle troposphere created conditions favorable for tornadogenesis, producing high convective available potential energy. In Shandong, the tornadoes inflicted EF0/EF1 damage on the Enhanced Fujita scale upon Jianglou, Binzhou, and Yanwo, while Dongying suffered EF2 damage, damaging buildings, breaking trees, and ruining crops. Direct economic losses due to Yagi totaled up to CN¥2.51 billion (US$379.383 million).

=== Elsewhere ===
The Okinawa Meteorological Observatory forecasted that rainfall of up to 30 mm (1.2 in) per hour would occur over Okinawa Island. In the Daitō Islands, winds of 90 km/h (56 mph) and gusts of 110 km/h (67 mph) were expected, as well as strong northwesterly winds over the Sakishima Islands. The highest rainfall was recorded over Miyakojima at 282.5 mm (11.12 in), with the highest 24-hour total being 257.5 mm (10.14 in) at Gusukube. Winds of 63 km/h (39 mph) swept Shimoji-shima. According to the Miyakojima Regional Meteorological Observatory, some areas in the city experienced "once-in-50-years" rainfall. Flights from Taiwan-based airlines heading towards the Ryukyu Islands were disrupted.

The Korea Meteorological Administration predicted that Yagi would make landfall along the China–North Korea border, bringing much needed rain to alleviate a heat wave that had killed over 40 in South Korea. The agency expected rainfall of 5–55 mm (0.20–2.17 in) throughout the nation, with Jeju Island expected to receive over 80 mm (3.1 in) of rain. However, Yagi turned away from the Korean Peninsula and headed back towards Shanghai, China. A strong wind advisory was issued for the Korean Sea far south of Jeju Island. Additionally, a storm surge warning was issued for the west coast of Gyeonggi Province.

== See also ==
- Weather of 2018
- Tropical cyclones in 2018
- Other systems named Yagi
- Other systems named Karding
