= List of storms named Yasi =

The name Yasi has been used for two tropical cyclones in the South Pacific Ocean:

- Cyclone Yasi (1996) – a Category 1 tropical cyclone that brought heavy rainfall to Tonga.
- Cyclone Yasi (2011) – a Category 5 severe tropical cyclone that became the costliest tropical cyclone in Australian history.

The name Yasi was retired after the 2010–11 season and replaced with Yvonne.

== See also ==
Storms with similar names

- Cyclone Yaas (2021) – a very severe cyclonic storm in the North Indian Ocean.
- Cyclone Yali (1998) – a Category 3 severe South Pacific tropical cyclone.
- Cyclone Yasa (2020) – the earliest Category 5 severe South Pacific tropical cyclone on record.
