= List of storms named Yeyeng =

The name Yeyeng has been used to name five tropical cyclones in the Philippine Area of Responsibility by the PAGASA and its predecessor, the Philippine Weather Bureau.

- Tropical Storm Wendy (1965) (T6536, 30W, Yeyeng) – a tropical storm that remained over the open ocean.
- Typhoon Mary (1977) (T7721, 21W, Yeyeng) – a Category 2 typhoon that moved through the Marshall Islands and struck the Philippines as a tropical depression.
- Typhoon Hazen (1981) (T8125, 25W, Yeyeng) – a Category 3 typhoon that struck the Philippines and Vietnam
- Tropical Depression Yeyeng (1989) – a depression only recognized by the PAGASA.
- Tropical Storm Becky (1993) (T9318, 22W, Yeyeng) – a tropical storm that brushed Luzon before striking Guangdong, China

After the 2000 Pacific typhoon season, the PAGASA revised their naming lists, and the name Yeyeng was excluded.
