= Typhoon Ruby (1964) =

Pacific typhoon in 1964

Typhoon Ruby (Yoning)
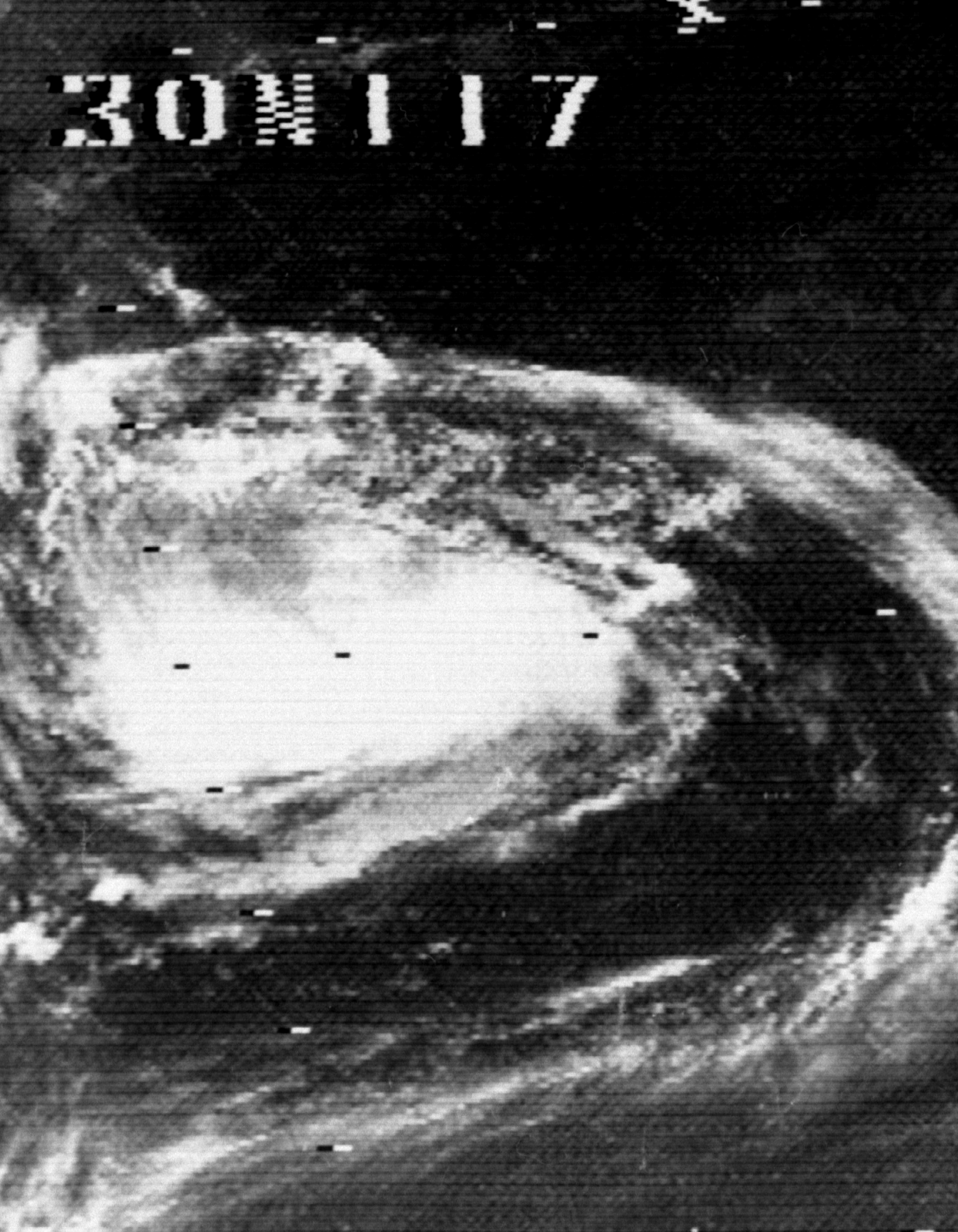
- Nimbus 1 satellite image of Typhoon Ruby (Yoning) on September 7 after the typhoon moved inland over southeastern China

Meteorological history
- Formed: September 1, 1964
- Dissipated: September 6, 1964

Violent typhoon
- 10-minute sustained (JMA)
- Highest winds: 195 km/h (120 mph)
- Lowest pressure: 960 hPa (mbar); 28.35 inHg

Category 4-equivalent typhoon
- 1-minute sustained (SSHWS/JTWC)
- Highest winds: 220 km/h (140 mph)
- Lowest pressure: 963 hPa (mbar); 28.44 inHg

Overall effects
- Fatalities: ≥ 758 fatalities, 14 missing
- Damage: Unknown
- Areas affected: Philippines, Hong Kong, Macau, South China
- Part of the 1964 Pacific typhoon season

Typhoon Ruby, known in the Philippines as Typhoon Yoning, was a strong tropical cyclone that struck Hong Kong, Macau, and southern China in early September 1964. The precursor disturbance to Ruby was first identified on August 29 over the Philippine Sea, and this system organised into a tropical cyclone by September 1. Ruby intensified as it moved west, becoming a typhoon the next day and subsequently passing over the Babuyan Islands of the Philippines. After reaching the South China Sea, Ruby turned northwest and intensified further, attaining peak ten-minute sustained winds of 195 km/h (121 mph) before making landfall at the peak intensity near Hong Kong on September 5. The typhoon weakened after moving inland and dissipated on September 6 over southeastern China.

Despite brushing Philippines as a typhoon, no impacts were recorded. Ruby was one of the strongest typhoons to hit Hong Kong in the city's history. The storm produced a peak wind gust of 268 km/h (167 mph) at Tate's Cairn and a gust of 230 km/h (140 mph) on Waglan Island; the latter was the strongest gust observed for that site. The storm sank 314 fishing vessels and destroyed or damaged thousands of homes. Rain-triggered landslides and wind-blown debris caused 300 injuries. Among locales in Hong Kong, Tai Po was most seriously affected. A total of 38 fatalities were attributed to Ruby in Hong Kong, though another 14 people remained unaccounted for. A wind gust of 211 km/h (131 mph) generated by Ruby in Macau was the strongest gust measured there on record; at least 20 fatalities were reported in Macau. The typhoon caused serious flooding along the mouth of the Pearl River in Guangdong Province in South China, where at least 700 people were killed.

== Meteorological history ==
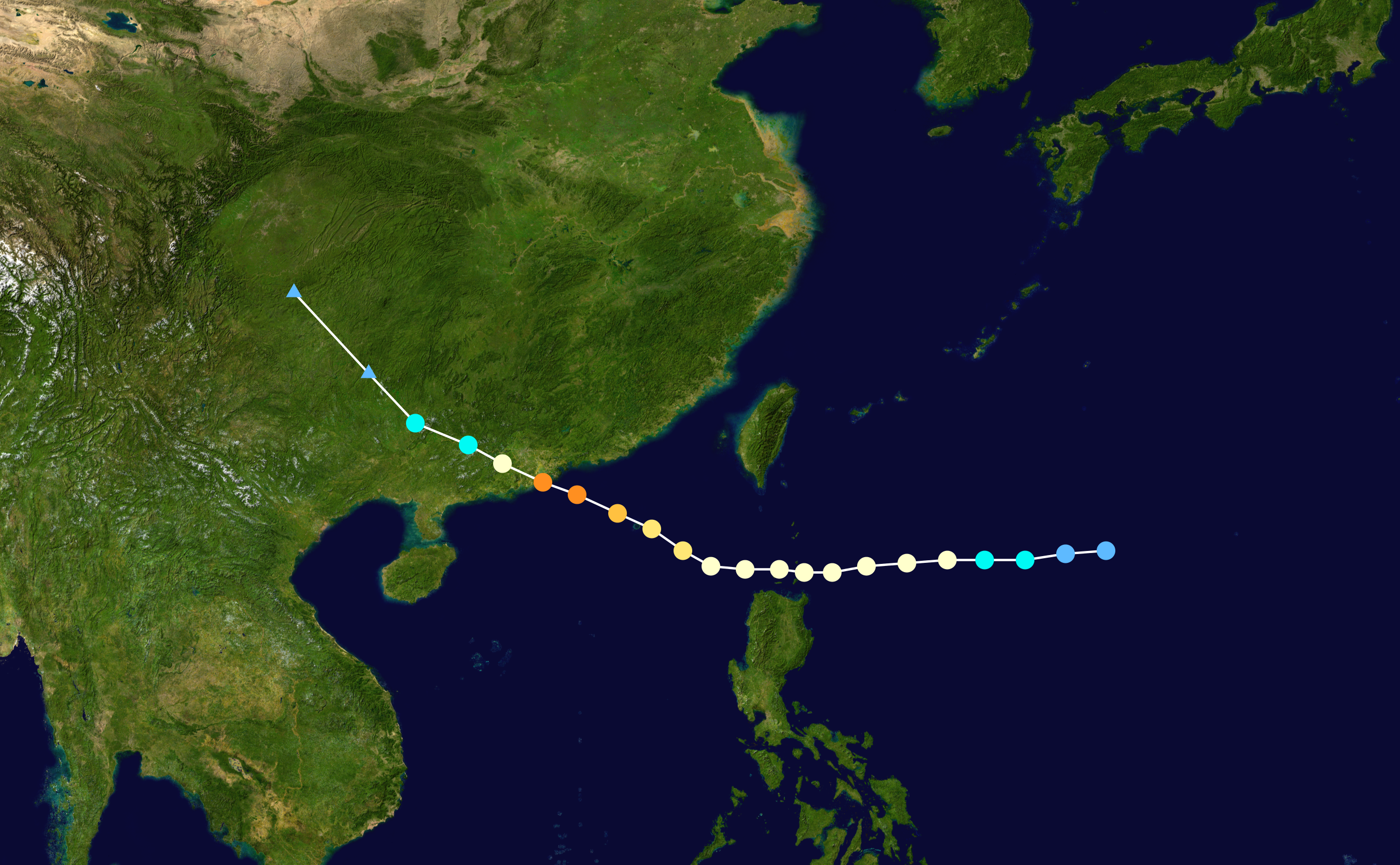
Map plotting the storm's track and intensity, according to the Saffir–Simpson scale Map key Saffir–Simpson scale Tropical depression (≤38 mph, ≤62 km/h) Tropical storm (39–73 mph, 63–118 km/h) Category 1 (74–95 mph, 119–153 km/h) Category 2 (96–110 mph, 154–177 km/h) Category 3 (111–129 mph, 178–208 km/h) Category 4 (130–156 mph, 209–251 km/h) Category 5 (≥157 mph, ≥252 km/h) Unknown Storm type Tropical cyclone Subtropical cyclone Extratropical cyclone, remnant low, tropical disturbance, or monsoon depression

The genesis of Typhoon Ruby stemmed from the interaction of a trough of low pressure and a westward-propagating tropical wave. This interaction led to the formation of a wind circulation west of Saipan on August 29, 1964. It initially moved west-northwest before curving west. Nimbus 1, a weather satellite, was used to detect and locate this precursor disturbance 21 hours prior to investigation from aircraft reconnaissance. For the first twelve hours on September 1, the disturbance became a tropical depression, (Note: Based on JMA and HKO (06:00 UTC) data from International Best Track Archive for Climate Stewardship (IBTrACS).) and by around 12:00 UTC, the tropical depression had strengthened into a tropical storm while over the central Philippine Sea, 965 km (600 mi) east of Basco, Batanes, in the Philippines. Ruby initially moved slightly south of west with a forward speed of 28 km/h (17 mph). It became a severe tropical storm within 18 hours of tropical cyclogenesis according to data from the Hong Kong Observatory (known as the Royal Observatory in 1964). Aircraft reconnaissance estimated one-minute maximum sustained winds of 100 km/h (62 mph) on their first intercept of the system on September 1. Data from the JTWC and HKO indicate Ruby became a typhoon by 12:00 UTC on September 2.

Ruby passed north of Luzon and across the Babuyan Islands as a typhoon on September 3 with one-minute sustained winds estimated by the JTWC at 140 km/h (87 mph) and ten-minute sustained winds estimated by the HKO at 120 km/h (75 mph). According to the Japan Meteorological Agency (JMA), Ruby's barometric pressure reached a minimum of 972 hPa (mbar; 28.70 inHg) during this time; this is disputed by the HKO and the China Meteorological Administration (CMA), which both analysed Ruby's pressure to have continued falling for at least two more days. On September 4, Ruby turned towards the northwest while 200 km (120 mi) northwest of Luzon. While ship observations were scant in the northern South China Sea following the issuance of typhoon warnings, aircraft reconnaissance and satellite imagery provided data on Ruby's position and intensity as it approached Hong Kong, Macau, and the southeastern coast of China. On September 5, Ruby's one-minute sustained winds topped out at 220 km/h (140 mph) according to the JTWC, with the HKO reporting ten-minute sustained winds peaking at 195 km/h (121 mph); in the HKO classification system, this made Ruby a super typhoon. The CMA and HKO both estimated Ruby's central atmospheric pressure bottomed out at 960 hPa (mbar; 28.35 inHg). Ruby made landfall near Hong Kong at peak intensity at around 09:00 UTC on September 5. Its eye spanned approximately 30 km (19 mi) across. Ruby weakened after moving inland, degenerating into a tropical storm by September 6 and dissipating inland over southeastern China later that day.

== Preparations and impact ==
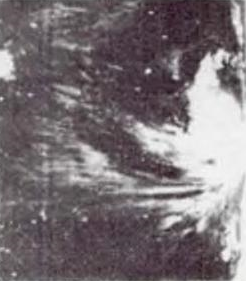
Ruby after becoming a typhoon northeast of the Philippines on September 2

Storm warnings were issued for northern Luzon and the Babuyan and Batanes islands on September 3. The Royal Observatory Hong Kong declared tropical cyclone signal no. 1 at 22:15 UTC on September 3 when Ruby was centered roughly 595 km (370 mi) east of Hong Kong. The Royal Observatory escalated these warnings as Ruby approached, with signal no. 3 issued at 18:35 UTC on September 4 and later signal no. 10 at 02:40 UTC on September 5; signal no. 10 was in effect for nearly four hours. As the storm passed, the signal severity decreased and the final signal was lifted at 04:50 UTC on September 5 after over 42 hours of active warnings. Ruby was the fifth typhoon to warrant the issuance of the no. 10 signal in Hong Kong since the inception of the modern tropical cyclone signal system in 1946 and the first two of these signals in 1964.

Ruby was the fourth tropical cyclone to enter the vicinity of Hong Kong in 1964, a year that featured a record amount of storms tracking near the Crown territory. Gale-force winds associated with Ruby reached Hong Kong on the morning of September 5 and continued to impact the Crown territory until the following night. The Royal Observatory headquarters measured a minimum air pressure of 968.2 hPa (mbar; 28.59 inHg) when the centre of the typhoon was roughly 30 km (19 mi) to the southwest. At Tate's Cairn, a wind gust of 268 km/h (167 mph) was registered; other measured peak gusts included 227 km/h (141 mph) at the Royal Observatory and 203 km/h (126 mph) at Kai Tak Airport. A 230 km/h (140 mph) gust on Waglan Island was the fastest observed in the island's history. Rainfall accumulations in Hong Kong reached at least 175 mm (6.9 in) in 24 hours. The Royal Observatory recorded at least (165 mm) 6.50 in of rain from the storm. Ruby produced a maximum storm surge height of 1.49 m (4 ft 11 in) at Quarry Bay.

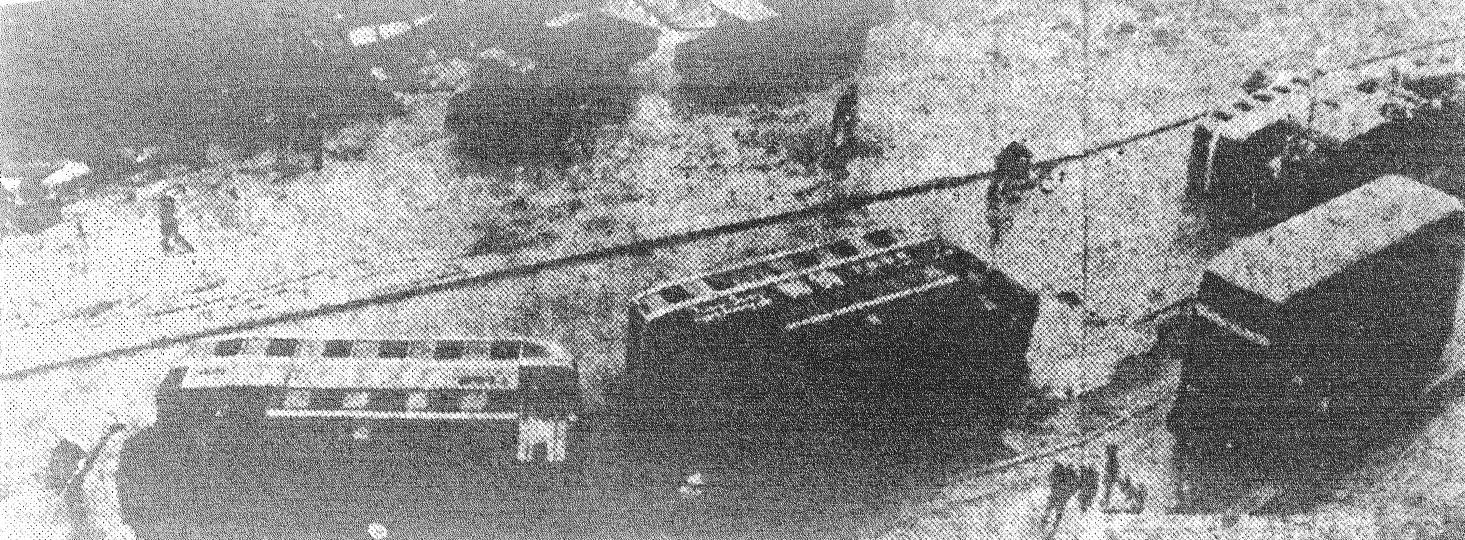
Damaged railcars in Hong Kong

There were 38 fatalities in Hong Kong associated with Ruby, though 14 others were never accounted for. Another 300 people were injured by the storm, and a total of 8,500 people were classified by the Royal Observatory as "disaster victims". Numerous injuries were caused by sheet metal torn from buildings under construction in downtown Hong Kong. Fifty thousand refugees from the People's Republic of China were rendered homeless. The typhoon destroyed or damaged 314 fishing vessels and 20 ships throughout the Hong Kong area. At least ten ships ran aground. Nine people were lost after a Panamanian freighter, the Dorar, sank in Victoria Harbour; 14 others were rescued. Kai Tak International Airport, ferry service, and other transportation systems were brought to a standstill throughout Hong Kong, in addition to the Hong Kong Stock Exchange. Roads were blocked by toppled trees and overturned cars. One road was obstructed by cranes that fell from a 20-storey building. Heavy rainfall caused by Ruby led to floods, landslides, and razed homes. High voltage electrical wires torn by the winds caused hundreds of fires before the power service was terminated. Tai Po was the hardest-hit area in Hong Kong; there, the storm destroyed thousands of village houses and temporary shelters. In Kowloon and Tsuen Wan, 1,368 houses were affected. A loosened boulder in Kowloon trapped ten people. At Mui Wo, 30 homes were destroyed and 180 others were unroofed. High waves pushed water into the Hong Kong City Hall, causing a delay in the 1964 Summer Olympics torch relay. Following the passage of Ruby, hundreds of workers cleared and repaired streets most seriously impacted in Hong Kong. The colonial government appealed for public donations for victims of Ruby on September 6. Hot meals and cash assistance were prepared for the displaced Chinese refugees in Hong Kong by government welfare groups.

A 211 km/h (131 mph) wind gust in Taipa, Macau, set a new record for the fastest gust measured there; this record was later superseded by Typhoon Hato in 2017. The typhoon triggered a fire that destroyed a building there. Over 20 people were killed and 100 others were injured in Macau. "Severe flooding" occurred in Guangdong Province throughout the province and along the Pearl River delta. Many homes collapsed, and the damage there was the most severe since 1949. Xiangshan County was the hardest-hit region. More than 700 people were reportedly killed in Guangdong Province, including the unconfirmed deaths of 300 people following the collapse of a school dormitory. The devastation in Guangdong led to an increased influx of refugees fleeing the People's Republic of China for Hong Kong.

== See also ==
- Typhoon Wanda (1962)
- Typhoon Hope (1979)
- Typhoon Rose (1971)
- Typhoon Kent (1995)
