= Nimbus 1 =

Former U.S. meteorological satellite

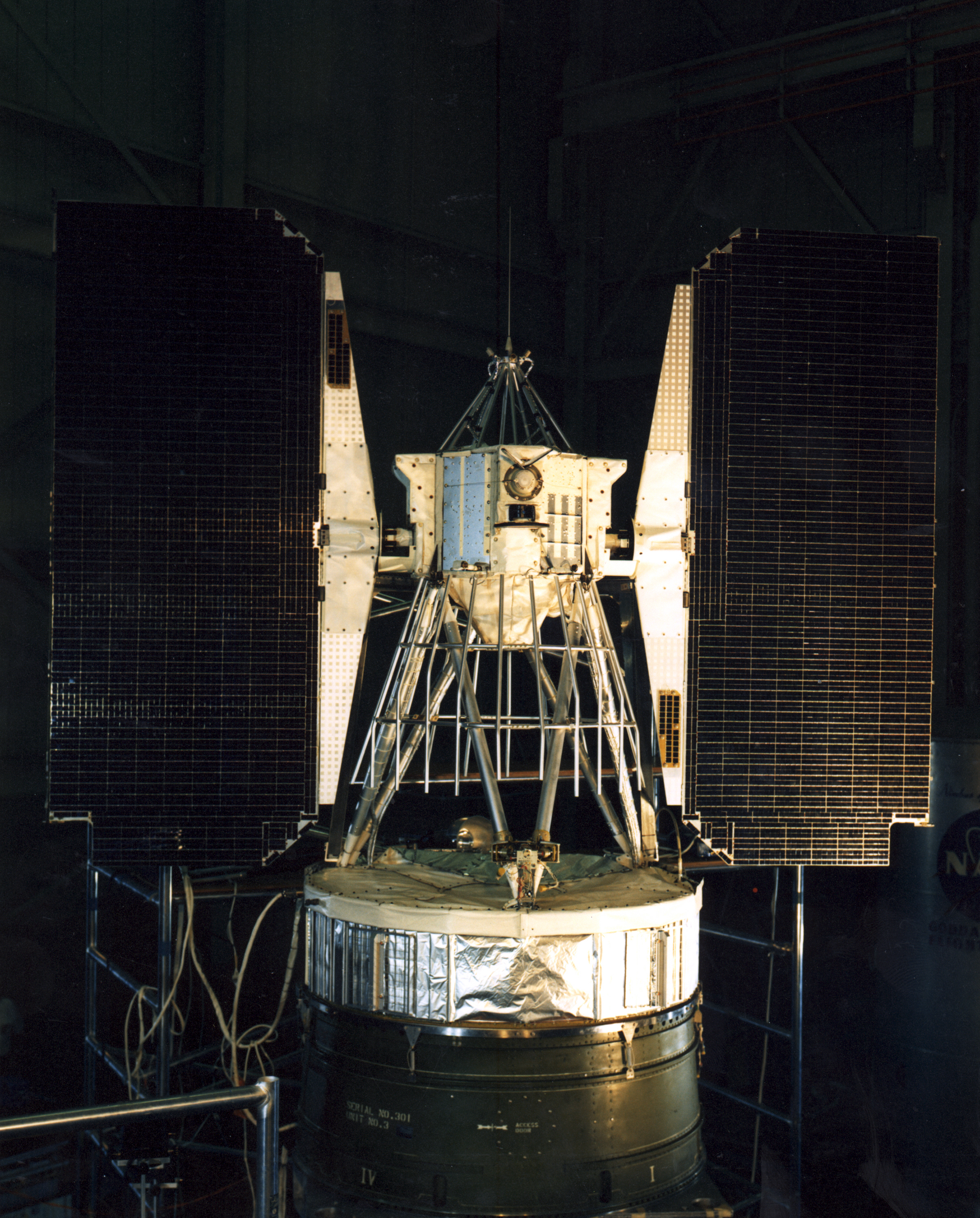
- Nimbus 1 (Nimbus-A)
- Mission type: Weather satellite
- Operator: NASA
- COSPAR ID: 1964-052A
- SATCAT no.: 872
- Mission duration: 25 days

Spacecraft properties
- Manufacturer: RCA Astrospace
- Launch mass: 374.4 kilograms (825 lb)
- Dimensions: 3.7 m × 1.5 m × 3.0 m (12.1 ft × 4.9 ft × 9.8 ft)

Start of mission
- Launch date: August 28, 1964, 07:56:57 UTC
- Rocket: Thor-DM21 Agena-B
- Launch site: Vandenberg 75-1-1

End of mission
- Last contact: September 22, 1964
- Decay date: May 16, 1974

Orbital parameters
- Reference system: Geocentric
- Regime: Low Earth
- Eccentricity: 0.03595
- Perigee altitude: 429 kilometers (267 mi)
- Apogee altitude: 937 kilometers (582 mi)
- Inclination: 98.66°
- Period: 98.42 minutes
- Epoch: August 28, 1964

Nimbus 1 (also called Nimbus-A) was a meteorological satellite. It was the first in a series of the Nimbus program.

== Launch ==
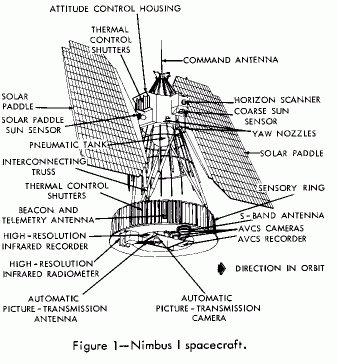
Instruments of Nimbus 1

Nimbus 1 was launched on August 28, 1964, by a Thor-Agena rocket from Vandenberg Air Force Base, California, United States. The spacecraft functioned nominally until September 22, 1964. It re-entered Earth's atmosphere on May 16, 1974. The satellite orbited the Earth once every 1 hour and 38 minutes, at an inclination of 98.6°. Its perigee was 429 kilometers (267 mi) and its apogee was 937 kilometers (582 mi).

== Mission ==
The first in a series of second-generation meteorological research-and-development satellites, Nimbus 1 was designed to serve as a stabilized, Earth-oriented platform for the testing of advanced meteorological sensor systems and for collecting meteorological data. The polar-orbiting spacecraft consisted of three major elements: (1) a torus-shaped sensory ring, (2) solar paddles, and (3) the control system housing. The solar paddles and control system housing were connected to the sensory ring by a truss structure, giving the satellite the appearance of an ocean buoy.

Nimbus 1 was nearly 3.7 metres (12 ft) tall, 1.5 metres (4.9 ft) in diameter at the base, and about 3 metres (9.8 ft) across with solar paddles extended. The sensory ring, which formed the satellite base, housed the electronics equipment and battery modules. The lower surface of the sensory ring provided mounting space for sensors and telemetry antennas. An H-frame structure, mounted within the center of the torus, provided support for the larger experiments and tape recorders. Mounted on the control system housing, which was located on top of the spacecraft, were Sun sensors, horizon scanners, gas nozzles for attitude control, and a command antenna.

Use of a stabilization and control system allowed the spacecraft's orientation to be controlled to within plus or minus 1° for all three axes (pitch, roll, yaw). The spacecraft carried:

- Advanced Vidicon Camera System (AVCS): instrument for recording and storing remote cloud cover pictures
- Automatic Picture Transmission (APT): instrument for providing real-time cloud cover pictures
- High-Resolution Infrared Radiometer (HRIR): to complement the daytime TV coverage and to measure nighttime radiative temperatures of cloud tops and surface terrain

A short second-stage burn resulted in an unplanned eccentric orbit. Otherwise, the spacecraft and its experiments operated successfully until September 22, 1964, when the solar paddles became locked in position, resulting in inadequate electric energy to continue operations.
