= List of storms named Yaning =

The name Yaning has been used for five tropical cyclones in the Philippine Area of Responsibility by the PAGASA in the Western Pacific Ocean.

- Tropical Storm Faye (1974) (Yaning) – a tropical storm that affected the Philippines, Vietnam and Thailand.
- Tropical Storm Nina (1978) (T7823, 24W, Yaning) – a tropical storm that crossed the Philippines, killing 59, and then made landfall in Eastern China.
- Tropical Depression 25W (1982) (25W, Yaning) – a tropical depression northeast of the Philippines.
- Typhoon Kim (1986) (T8626, 23W, Yaning) – a Category 4 super typhoon that remained over the open ocean.
- Tropical Depression Yaning (1994) – a short-lived depression that formed near the Visayas.

After the 2000 Pacific typhoon season, the PAGASA revised their naming lists and the name Yaning was excluded.
