= Timeline of the 1995 Pacific hurricane season =

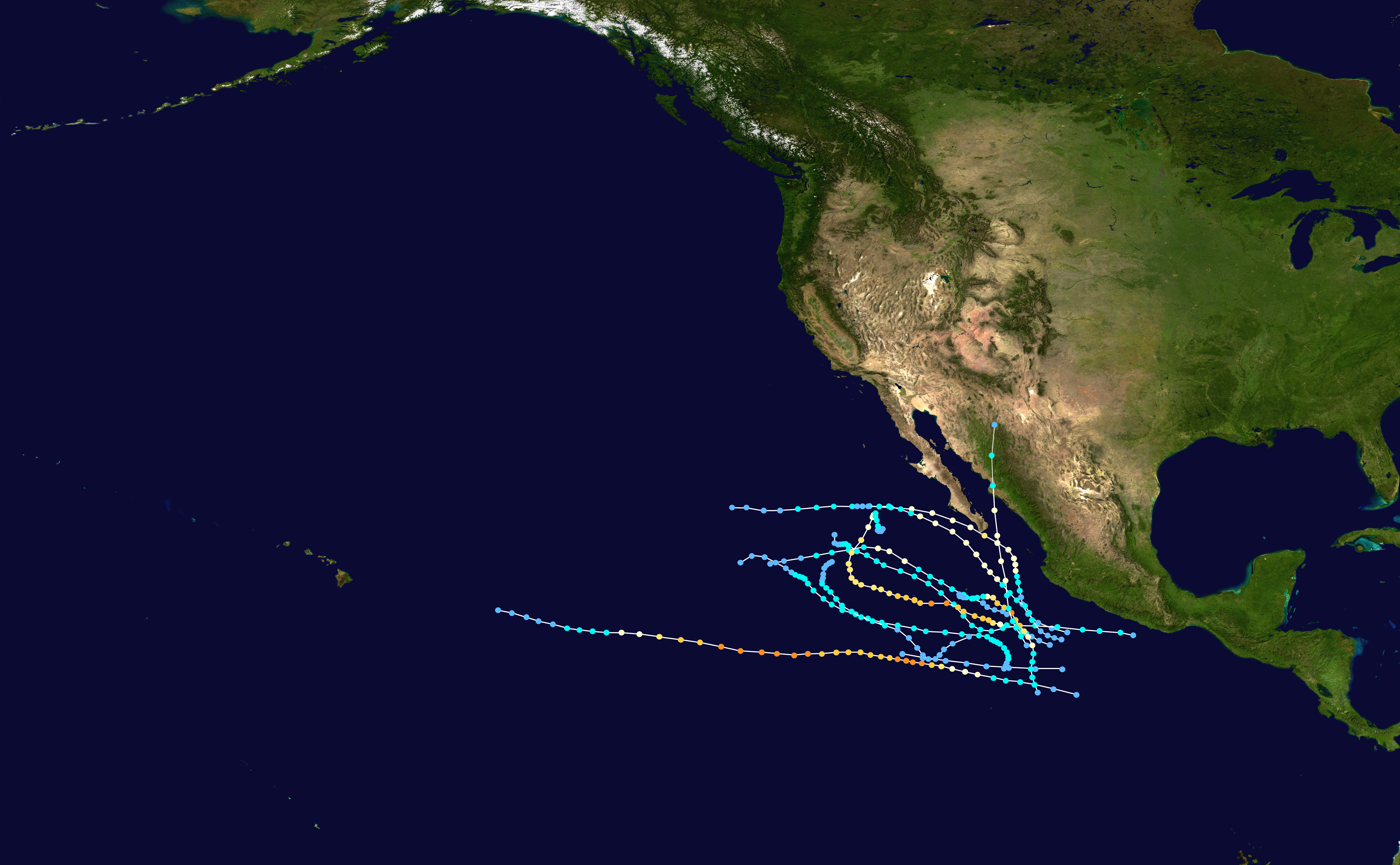
- Season summary map

Season boundaries
- First system formed: May 21, 1995
- Last system dissipated: September 26, 1995

Strongest system
- Name: Juliette
- Maximum winds: 150 mph (240 km/h) (1-minute sustained)
- Lowest pressure: 930 mbar (hPa; 27.46 inHg)

Longest lasting system
- Name: Barbara
- Duration: 10.50 days
Storm articles
- Hurricane Flossie (1995)
- Hurricane Ismael

The 1995 Pacific hurricane season consisted of the events that occurred in the annual cycle of tropical cyclone formation over the Pacific Ocean north of the equator and east of the International Date Line. The official bounds of each Pacific hurricane season are dates that conventionally delineate the period each year during which tropical cyclones tend to form in the basin according to the National Hurricane Center (NHC), beginning on May 15 in the Eastern Pacific proper (east of 140°W) and June 1 in the Central Pacific (140°W to the International Date Line), and ending on November 30 in both areas. However, tropical cyclogenesis is possible at any time of year. Activity during the season was below average; (Note: During the period from 1991 to 2020, an average Pacific hurricane season generated fifteen tropical storms, eight hurricanes, and four major hurricanes.) only eleven tropical depressions developed, of which ten strengthened into named tropical storms. Seven became hurricanes, of which three further intensified into major hurricanes. (Note: A major hurricane is a Pacific or Atlantic hurricane that reaches Category 3 or higher on the five-level Saffir–Simpson scale, with maximum sustained winds of at least 111 mph (179 km/h).) Hurricane Barbara was the only tropical cyclone to exist in the Central Pacific in 1995, entering the region as a weak system near dissipation. The first system, Tropical Depression One-E, formed on May 21; the final, Hurricane Juliette, dissipated on September 26, making this season the first since the beginning of the satellite era in which no tropical cyclones were active after September.

The vast majority of damage and casualties during the season resulted from Hurricane Ismael in mid-September. It was initially expected to move slowly to the west or northwest, which would have kept it over open ocean. Instead, it accelerated northward and struck northwestern Mexico, catching many in its path unprepared. High seas damaged or destroyed fifty-two fishing boats, killing fifty-seven fishermen. On land, strong winds and severe flooding caused heavy damage and killed fifty-nine people in the Mexican state of Sinaloa. The name Ismael was later retired on account of the hurricane's disastrous effects. Two other hurricanes, Flossie and Henriette, adversely affected land. Flossie in August remained off the coast of Mexico but passed close enough to cause gusty winds and flooding rains; seven people died. An eighth death occurred after Flossie helped generate severe thunderstorms and flash floods in Arizona. In early September, Henriette made landfall at peak intensity on the southern tip of the Baja California peninsula before continuing westward out to sea; it caused moderate damage, but no known fatalities.

Prior to 2015, two time zones were utilized in the Eastern Pacific basin: Pacific east of 140°W, and Hawaii−Aleutian from 140°W to the International Date Line. For convenience, each event is listed in Coordinated Universal Time (UTC) first, using the 24-hour clock (where 00:00 = midnight UTC), with the respective local time included in parentheses. Figures for maximum sustained winds and position estimates are rounded to the nearest five units (knots, miles, or kilometers) and averaged over one minute, following National Hurricane Center practice. Direct wind observations are rounded to the nearest whole number. Atmospheric pressures are listed to the nearest millibar and nearest hundredth of an inch of mercury. This timeline documents the formation of tropical cyclones as well as the strengthening, weakening, landfalls, extratropical transitions, and dissipations during the season. It also includes information that was not released while the storm was active, meaning that data from post-storm reviews by the National Hurricane Center and the Central Pacific Hurricane Center is included.

== Timeline of events ==
=== May ===
==== May 15 ====
- The 1995 Eastern Pacific hurricane season officially begins.

==== May 21 ====
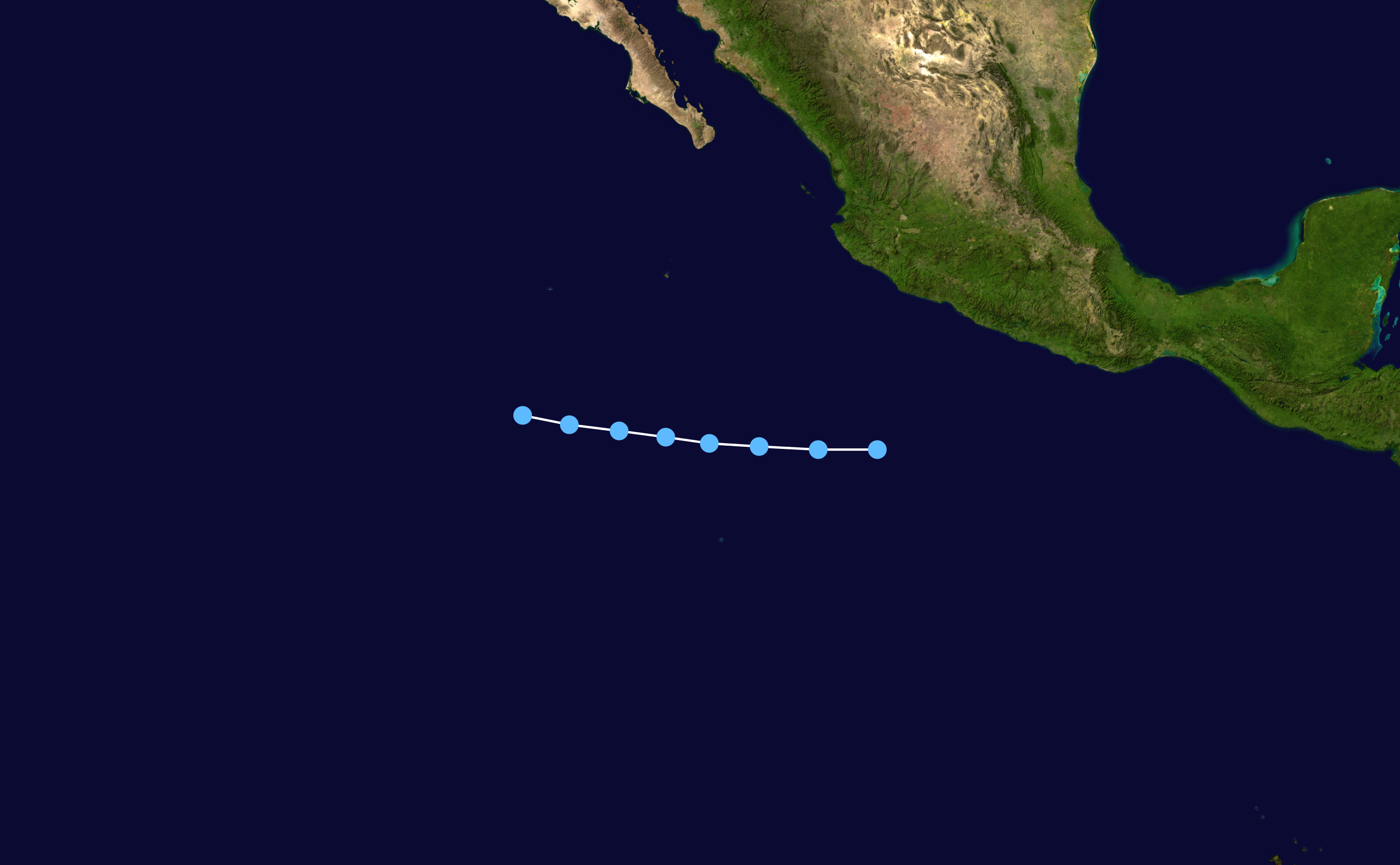
Storm path of Tropical Depression One-E

- 06:00 UTC (11:00 p.m. PDT, May 20) at 13.2°N 104.2°W – Tropical Depression One-E forms from an Intertropical Convergence Zone disturbance about 405 mi (650 km) south of Manzanillo, Colima; it simultaneously attains peak winds of 35 mph (55 km/h).

==== May 22 ====
- 00:00 UTC (5:00 p.m. PDT, May 21) at 13.4°N 109.6°W – Tropical Depression One-E attains a minimum barometric pressure of 1,005 mbar (29.68 inHg) about 525 mi (845 km) southwest of Manzanillo, Colima.

==== May 23 ====
- 00:00 UTC (5:00 p.m. PDT, May 22) at 14.3°N 115.6°W – Tropical Depression One-E is last noted as a tropical cyclone about 815 mi (1,315 km) west-southwest of Manzanillo, Colima; it dissipates six hours later.

=== June ===
==== June 1 ====
- The 1995 Central Pacific hurricane season officially begins.

==== June 15 ====
- 12:00 UTC (5:00 a.m. PDT) at 11.4°N 105.9°W – Tropical Depression Two-E forms from an area of unsettled weather about 835 mi (1,345 km) south-southeast of the southern tip of the Baja California peninsula.

==== June 16 ====
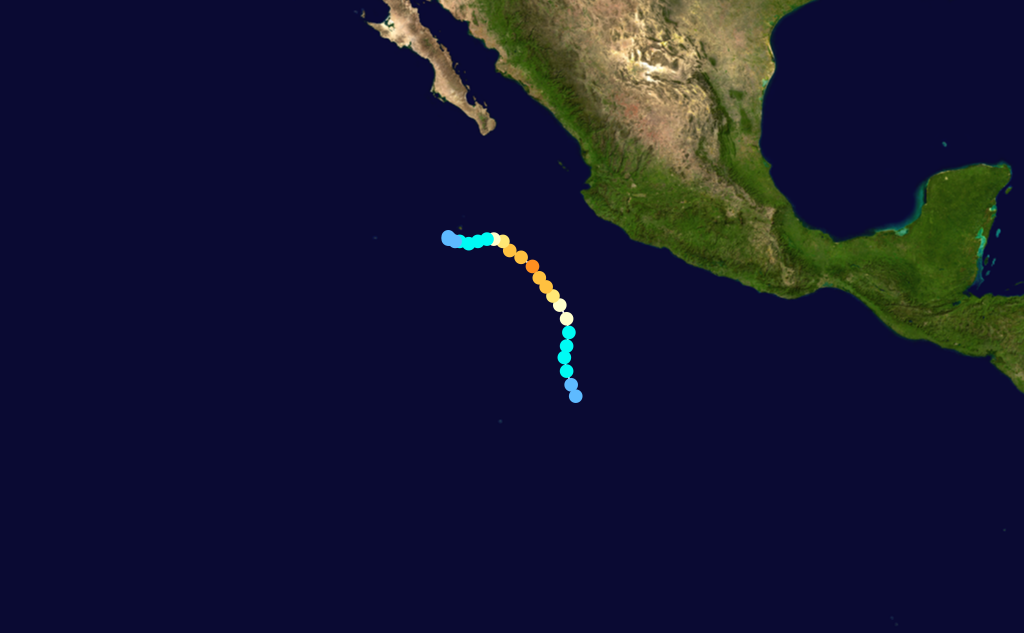
Storm path of Hurricane Adolph

- 00:00 UTC (5:00 p.m. PDT, June 15) at 12.5°N 106.3°W – Tropical Depression Two-E strengthens into Tropical Storm Adolph about 755 mi (1,215 km) south-southeast of the southern tip of the Baja California peninsula.

==== June 17 ====
- 00:00 UTC (5:00 p.m. PDT, June 16) at 14.8°N 106.3°W – Tropical Storm Adolph strengthens into a Category 1 hurricane about 605 mi (975 km) south-southeast of the southern tip of the Baja California peninsula.Hurricane Adolph strengthens to Category 2 intensity about 530 mi (850 km) south-southeast of the southern tip of the Baja California peninsula.
- 18:00 UTC (11:00 a.m. PDT) at 16.2°N 107.2°W – Hurricane Adolph strengthens to Category 3 intensity about 495 mi (795 km) south-southeast of the southern tip of the Baja California peninsula, making it the first major hurricane of the season.

==== June 18 ====
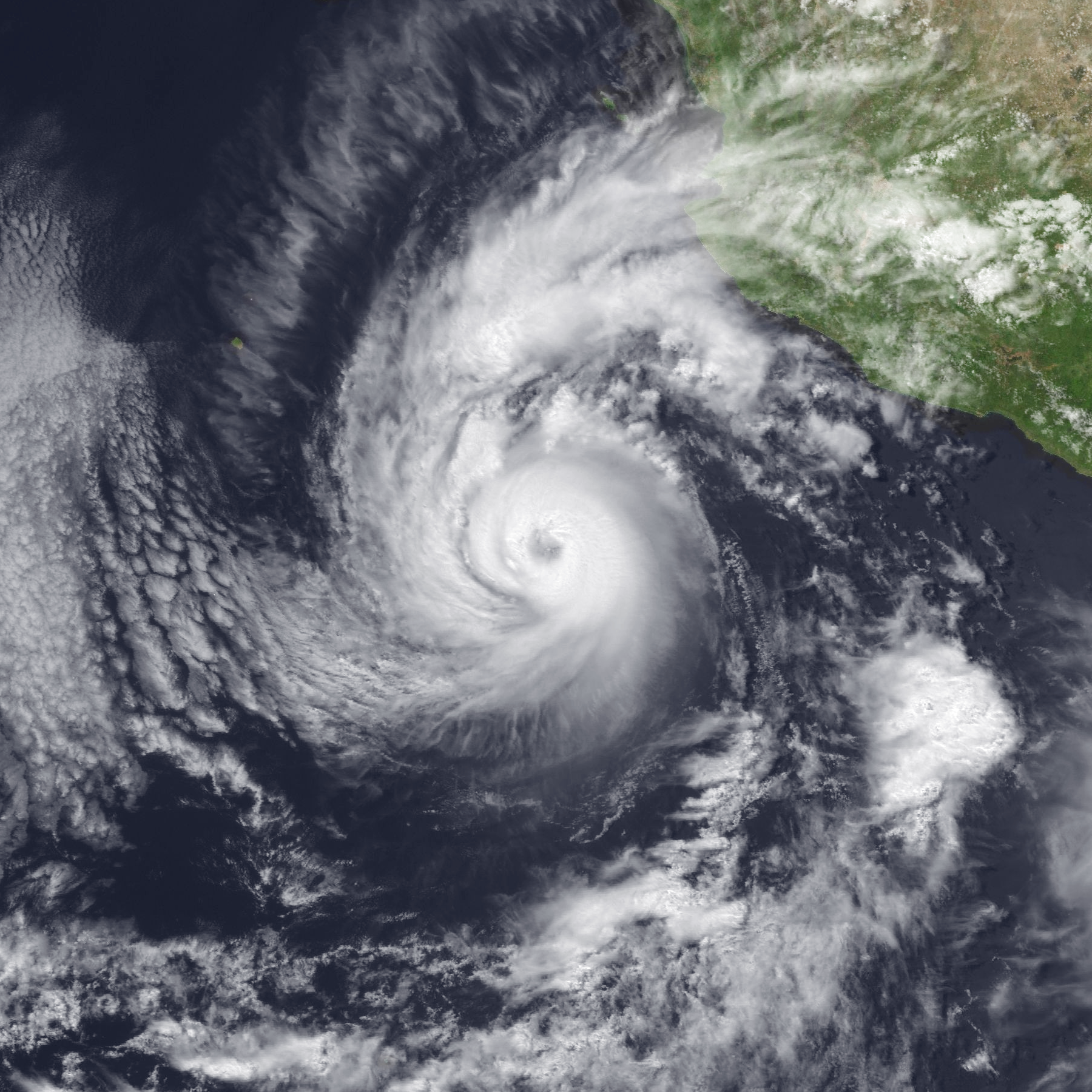
Satellite image of Hurricane Adolph shortly after becoming a major hurricane late on June 17

- 06:00 UTC (11:00 p.m. PDT, June 17) at 17.1°N 107.8°W – Hurricane Adolph strengthens to Category 4 intensity about 420 mi (675 km) south-southeast of the southern tip of the Baja California peninsula; it simultaneously attains peak winds of 130 mph (215 km/h) and a minimum barometric pressure of 948 mbar (27.99 inHg).
- 12:00 UTC (5:00 a.m. PDT) at 17.5°N 108.3°W – Hurricane Adolph weakens to Category 3 intensity about 385 mi (620 km) south-southeast of the southern tip of the Baja California peninsula.

==== June 19 ====
- 00:00 UTC (5:00 p.m. PDT, June 18) at 18.2°N 109.1°W – Hurricane Adolph weakens to Category 2 intensity about 330 mi (530 km) south of the southern tip of the Baja California peninsula.
- 06:00 UTC (11:00 p.m. PDT, June 18) at 18.3°N 109.5°W – Hurricane Adolph weakens to Category 1 intensity about 315 mi (510 km) south of the southern tip of the Baja California peninsula.
- 12:00 UTC (5:00 a.m. PDT) at 18.3°N 109.8°W – Hurricane Adolph weakens into a tropical storm about 315 mi (510 km) south of the southern tip of the Baja California peninsula.

==== June 20 ====
- 12:00 UTC (5:00 a.m. PDT) at 18.2°N 111.2°W – Tropical Storm Adolph weakens into a tropical depression about 335 mi (535 km) south-southwest of the southern tip of the Baja California peninsula.

==== June 21 ====
- 06:00 UTC (11:00 p.m. PDT, June 20) at 18.4°N 111.5°W – Tropical Depression Adolph is last noted as a tropical cyclone about 320 mi (520 km) south-southwest of the southern tip of the Baja California peninsula; it dissipates shortly thereafter.

=== July ===
==== July 7 ====
- 18:00 UTC (11:00 a.m. PDT) at 11.3°N 103.2°W – A tropical depression forms from a tropical wave about 540 mi (870 km) south of Manzanillo, Colima.

==== July 8 ====
- 06:00 UTC (11:00 p.m. PDT, July 7) at 12.0°N 106.2°W – The aforementioned tropical depression strengthens into Tropical Storm Barbara about 500 mi (805 km) south-southwest of Manzanillo, Colima.

==== July 9 ====
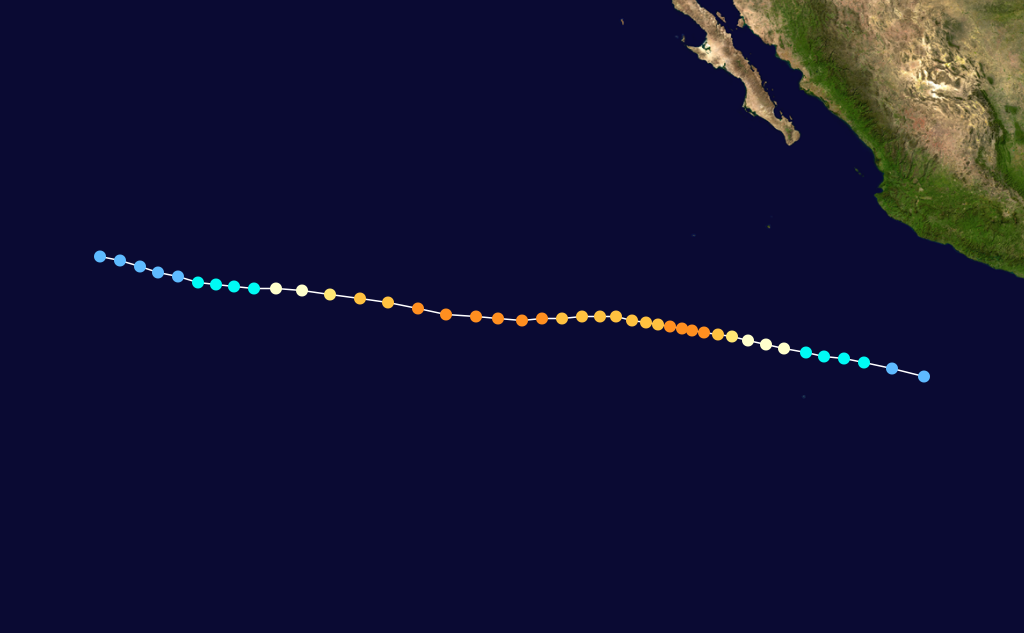
Storm path of Hurricane Barbara

- 06:00 UTC (11:00 p.m. PDT, July 8) at 12.7°N 110.2°W – Tropical Storm Barbara strengthens into a Category 1 hurricane about 585 mi (945 km) southwest of Manzanillo, Colima.

==== July 10 ====
- 00:00 UTC (5:00 p.m. PDT, July 9) at 13.3°N 112.8°W – Hurricane Barbara strengthens to Category 2 intensity about 690 mi (1,110 km) southwest of Manzanillo, Colima.
- 06:00 UTC (11:00 p.m. PDT, July 9) at 13.4°N 113.5°W – Hurricane Barbara strengthens to Category 3 intensity about 725 mi (1,165 km) west-southwest of Manzanillo, Colima, making it the second major hurricane of the season.
- 12:00 UTC (5:00 a.m. PDT) at 13.5°N 114.2°W – Hurricane Barbara strengthens to Category 4 intensity about 760 mi (1,225 km) west-southwest of Manzanillo, Colima; it simultaneously attains initial peak winds of 130 mph (215 km/h).

==== July 11 ====
- 00:00 UTC (5:00 p.m. PDT, July 10) at 13.7°N 115.3°W – Hurricane Barbara reaches an initial minimum barometric pressure of 945 mbar (27.91 inHg) about 815 mi (1,315 km) west-southwest of Manzanillo, Colima.
- 12:00 UTC (5:00 a.m. PDT) at 13.9°N 116.5°W – Hurricane Barbara weakens to Category 3 intensity about 880 mi (1,420 km) west-southwest of Manzanillo, Colima.

==== July 13 ====
- 06:00 UTC (11:00 p.m. PDT, July 12) at 14.2°N 122.3°W – Hurricane Barbara restrengthens to Category 4 intensity about 1,235 mi (1,990 km) west-southwest of Manzanillo, Colima.
- 18:00 UTC (11:00 a.m. PDT) at 14.2°N 124.5°W – Hurricane Barbara reaches peak winds of 140 mph (220 km/h) about 1,375 mi (2,215 km) west-southwest of Manzanillo, Colima.

==== July 14 ====
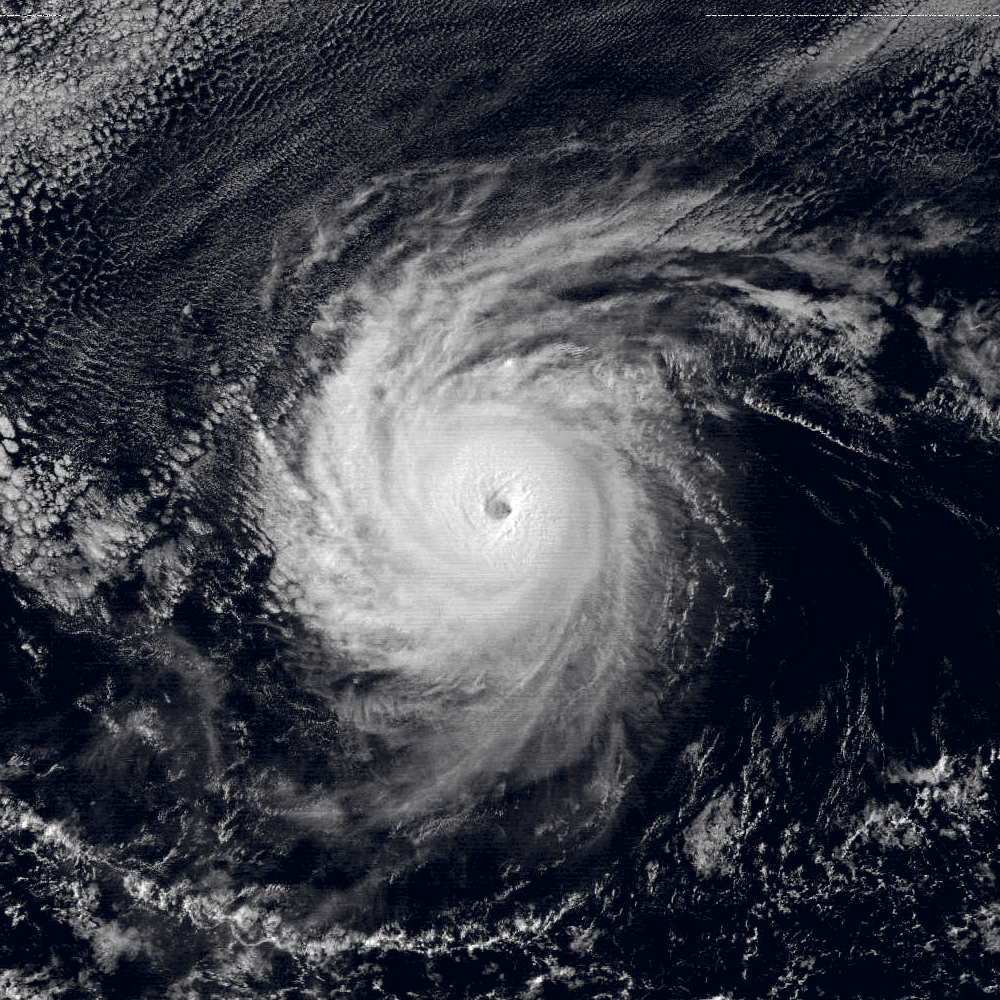
Satellite image of Hurricane Barbara at peak intensity early on July 14

- 00:00 UTC (5:00 p.m. PDT, July 13) at 14.3°N 125.8°W – Hurricane Barbara reaches a minimum barometric pressure of 940 mbar (27.76 inHg) about 1,455 mi (2,345 km) west-southwest of Manzanillo, Colima.
- 18:00 UTC (11:00 a.m. PDT) at 15.0°N 130.0°W – Hurricane Barbara weakens back to Category 3 intensity about 1,715 mi (2,760 km) west of Manzanillo, Colima.

==== July 15 ====
- 06:00 UTC (11:00 p.m. PDT, July 14) at 15.4°N 132.9°W – Hurricane Barbara weakens to Category 2 intensity about 1,900 mi (3,060 km) west of Manzanillo, Colima.
- 12:00 UTC (5:00 a.m. PDT) at 15.6°N 134.3°W – Hurricane Barbara weakens to Category 1 intensity about 1,990 mi (3,205 km) west of Manzanillo, Colima.

==== July 16 ====
- 00:00 UTC (5:00 p.m. PDT, July 15) at 15.7°N 136.7°W – Hurricane Barbara weakens into a tropical storm about 2,145 mi (3,455 km) west of Manzanillo, Colima.

==== July 17 ====
- 00:00 UTC (2:00 p.m. HST, July 16) at 16.3°N 140.5°W – Tropical Storm Barbara weakens into a tropical depression about 985 mi (1,585 km) east-southeast of Hilo, Hawaii; it simultaneously crosses 140°W, leaving the jurisdiction of the National Hurricane Center and entering the Central Pacific Hurricane Center's area of responsibility.
- 00:00 UTC (5:00 p.m. PDT, July 16) at 17.0°N 108.1°W – A tropical depression forms from an area of unsettled weather about 425 mi (685 km) south-southeast of the southern tip of the Baja California peninsula.

==== July 18 ====
- 00:00 UTC (2:00 p.m. HST, July 17) at 17.3°N 144.4°W – Tropical Depression Barbara is last noted as a tropical cyclone about 70 mi (1,160 km) east-southeast of Hilo, Hawaii; it dissipates shortly thereafter.
- 06:00 UTC (11:00 p.m. PDT, July 17) at 18.1°N 110.5°W – The tropical depression that had formed 30 hours earlier strengthens into Tropical Storm Cosme about 335 mi (535 km) south of the southern tip of the Baja California peninsula.

==== July 19 ====
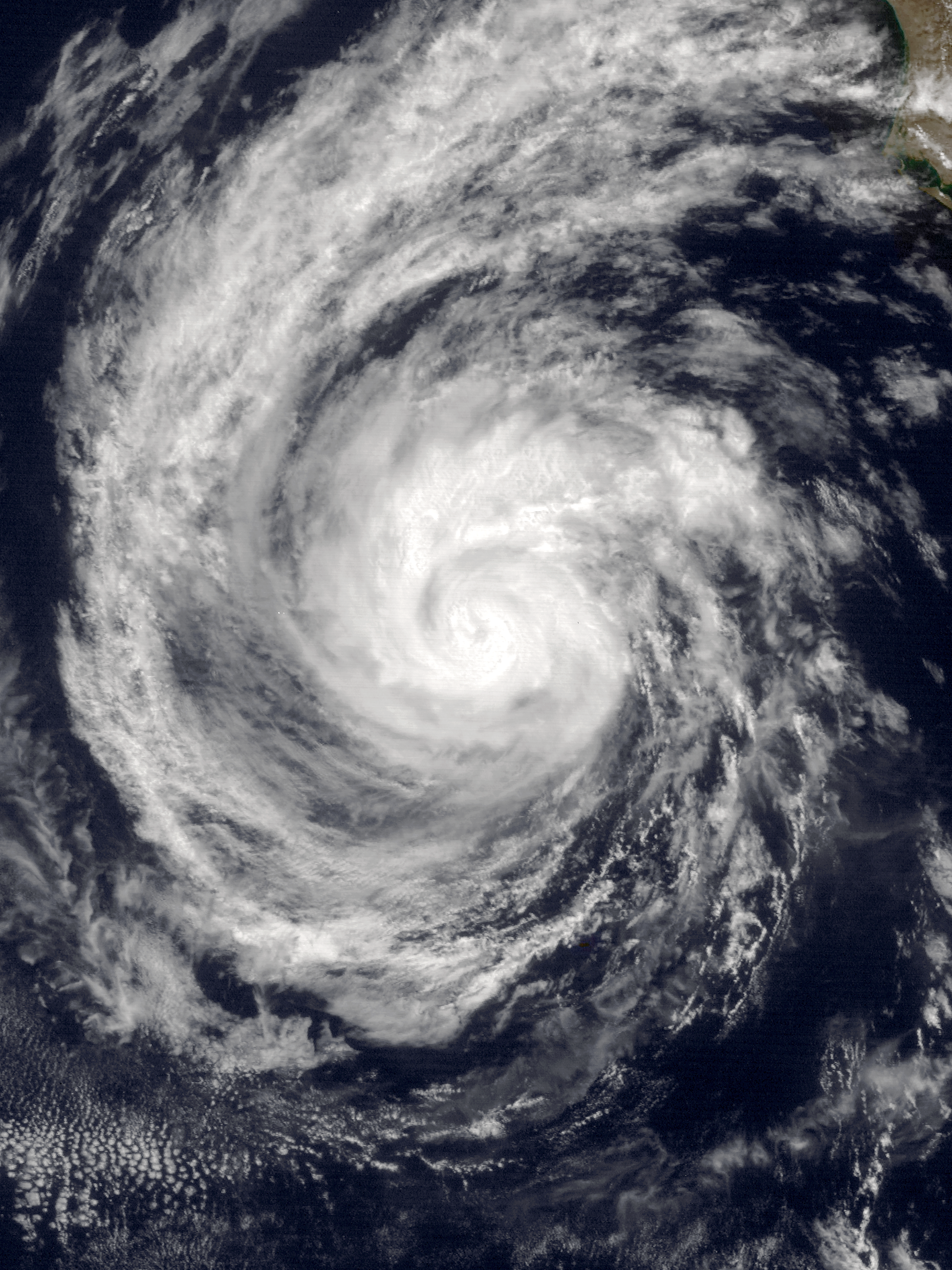
Satellite image of Hurricane Cosme shortly after being upgraded late on July 19

- 18:00 UTC (11:00 a.m. PDT) at 20.8°N 115.4°W – Tropical Storm Cosme strengthens into a Category 1 hurricane about 380 mi (610 km) west-southwest of the southern tip of the Baja California peninsula; it simultaneously attains peak winds of 75 mph (120 km/h).

==== July 20 ====
- 00:00 UTC (5:00 p.m. PDT, July 19) at 21.5°N 116.5°W – Hurricane Cosme attains a minimum barometric pressure of 985 mbar (29.09 inHg) about 430 mi (695 km) west-southwest of the southern tip of the Baja California peninsula.
- 12:00 UTC (5:00 a.m. PDT) at 21.8°N 118.3°W – Hurricane Cosme weakens into a tropical storm about 535 mi (860 km) west of the southern tip of the Baja California peninsula.

==== July 21 ====
- 12:00 UTC (5:00 a.m. PDT) at 21.0°N 122.8°W – Tropical Storm Cosme weakens into a tropical depression about 835 mi (1,345 km) west of the southern tip of the Baja California peninsula.

==== July 22 ====
- 00:00 UTC (5:00 p.m. PDT, July 21) at 20.6°N 125.0°W – Tropical Depression Cosme is last noted as a tropical cyclone about 980 mi (1,575 km) west of the southern tip of the Baja California peninsula; it dissipates six hours later.

==== July 24 ====
- 12:00 UTC (5:00 a.m. PDT) at 13.1°N 108.3°W – A tropical depression forms from a tropical wave about 685 mi (1,105 km) south of the southern tip of the Baja California peninsula.

==== July 25 ====
- 06:00 UTC (11:00 p.m. PDT, July 24) at 13.8°N 108.0°W – The aforementioned tropical depression strengthens into Tropical Storm Dalila about 640 mi (1,030 km) south of the southern tip of the Baja California peninsula.

==== July 28 ====
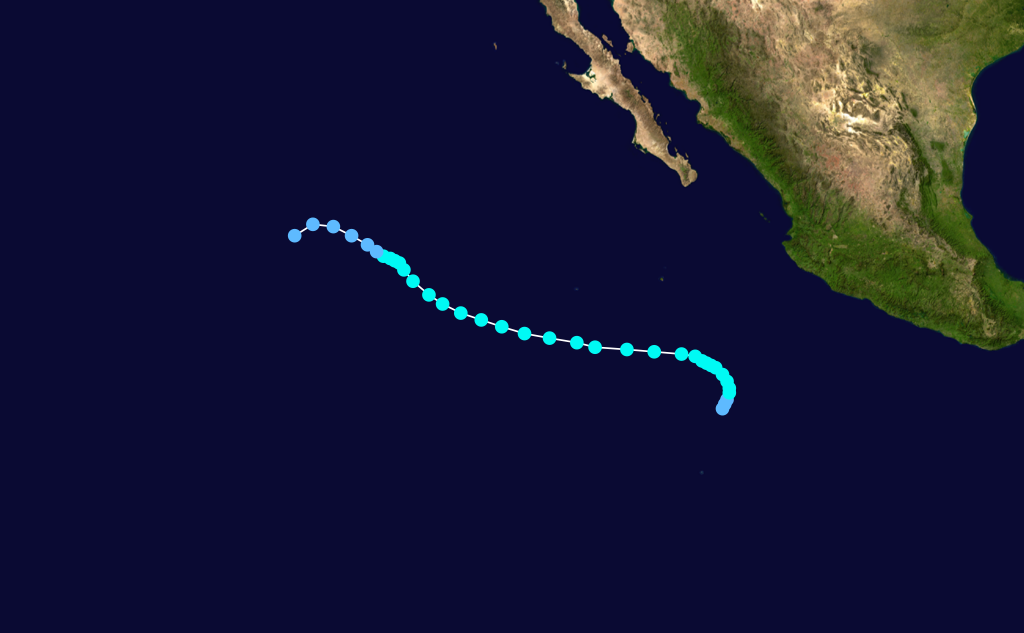
Storm path of Tropical Storm Dalila

- 18:00 UTC (11:00 a.m. PDT) at 16.2°N 115.9°W – Tropical Storm Dalila reaches peak winds of 65 mph (100 km/h) about 605 mi (975 km) southwest of the southern tip of the Baja California peninsula.

==== July 29 ====
- 00:00 UTC (5:00 p.m. PDT, July 28) at 16.4°N 117.0°W – Tropical Storm Dalila reaches a minimum barometric pressure of 994 mbar (29.35 inHg) about 640 mi (1,030 km) southwest of the southern tip of the Baja California peninsula.

=== August ===
==== August 1 ====
- 00:00 UTC (5:00 p.m. PDT, July 31) at 20.0°N 123.5°W – Tropical Storm Dalila weakens into a tropical depression about 890 mi (1,435 km) west-southwest of the southern tip of the Baja California peninsula.
- 18:00 UTC (11:00 a.m. PDT) at 15.4°N 110.8°W – Tropical Depression Six-E forms from a tropical wave about 520 mi (835 km) south of the southern tip of the Baja California peninsula.

==== August 2 ====
- 06:00 UTC (11:00 p.m. PDT, August 1) at 20.7°N 127.1°W – Tropical Depression Dalila is last noted as a tropical cyclone about 1,110 mi (1,790 km) west of the southern tip of the Baja California peninsula; it dissipates shortly thereafter.

==== August 4 ====
- 06:00 UTC (11:00 p.m. PDT, August 3) at 16.2°N 116.8°W – Tropical Depression Six-E strengthens into Tropical Storm Erick about 640 mi (1,030 km) southwest of the southern tip of the Baja California peninsula.

==== August 5 ====
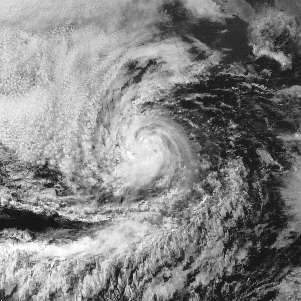
Satellite image of Tropical Storm Erick at peak intensity early on August 5

- 00:00 UTC (5:00 p.m. PDT, August 4) at 17.2°N 119.2°W – Tropical Storm Erick attains peak winds of 65 mph (100 km/h) and a minimum barometric pressure of 994 mbar (29.35 inHg) about 715 mi (1,150 km) southwest of the southern tip of the Baja California peninsula.

==== August 6 ====
- 12:00 UTC (5:00 a.m. PDT) at 19.4°N 121.3°W – Tropical Storm Erick weakens into a tropical depression about 770 mi (1,240 km) west-southwest of the southern tip of the Baja California peninsula.

==== August 7 ====
- 12:00 UTC (5:00 a.m. PDT) at 15.2°N 104.2°W – Tropical Depression Seven-E forms from an area of low pressure within a broad region of cyclonic rotation about 310 mi (500 km) west-southwest of Acapulco, Guerrero.

==== August 8 ====
- 00:00 UTC (5:00 p.m. PDT, August 7) at 20.7°N 120.6°W – Tropical Depression Erick is last noted as a tropical cyclone about 695 mi (1,120 km) west-southwest of the southern tip of the Baja California peninsula; it dissipates six hours later.
- 18:00 UTC (11:00 a.m. PDT) at 16.6°N 106.3°W – Tropical Depression Seven-E strengthens into Tropical Storm Flossie about 425 mi (685 km) west of Acapulco, Guerrero.

==== August 10 ====
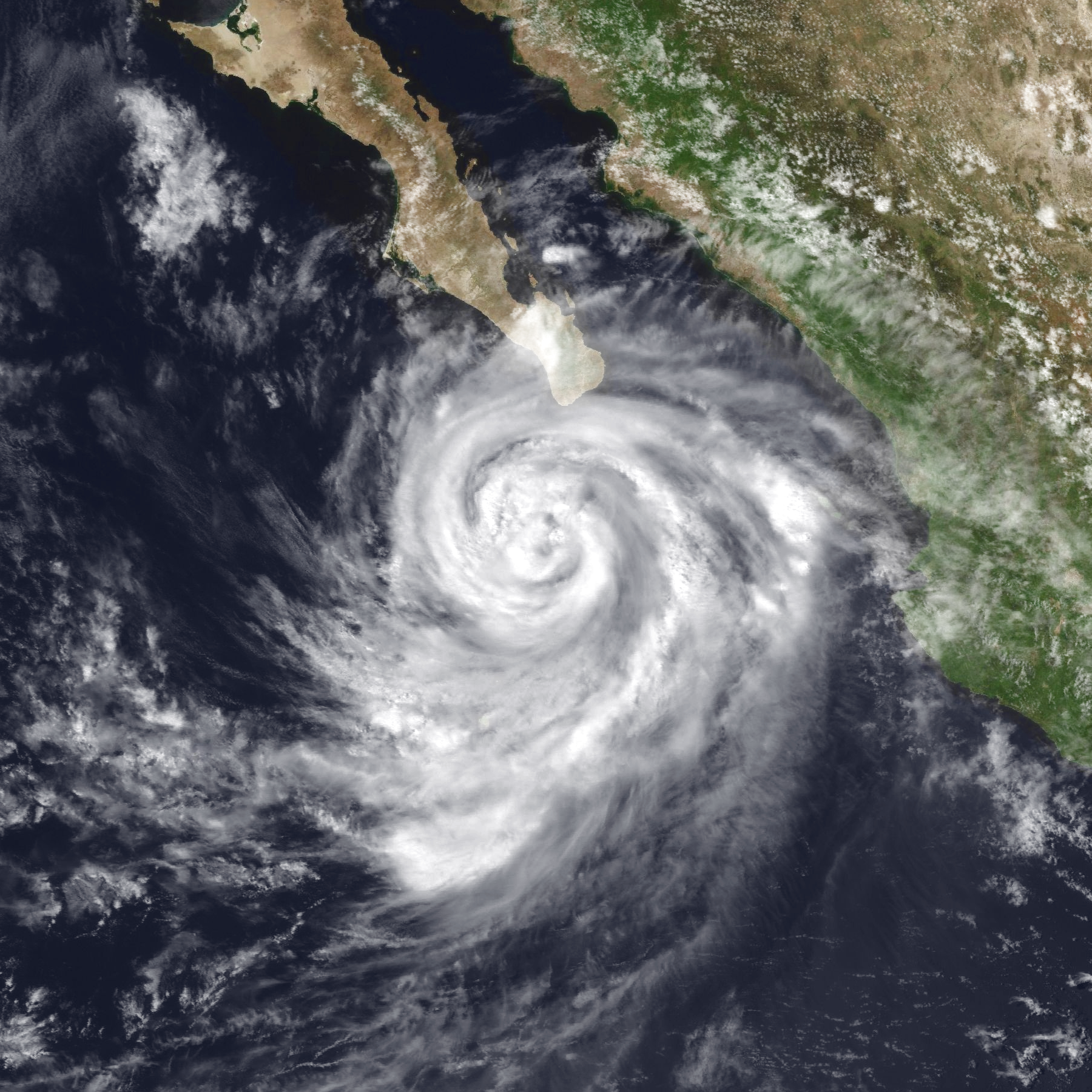
Satellite image of Hurricane Flossie at peak intensity late on August 10

- 06:00 UTC (11:00 p.m. PDT, August 9) at 19.5°N 108.8°W – Tropical Storm Flossie strengthens into a Category 1 hurricane about 245 mi (400 km) south-southeast of the southern tip of the Baja California peninsula.
- 12:00 UTC (5:00 a.m. PDT) at 20.0°N 109.3°W – Hurricane Flossie attains peak winds of 80 mph (130 km/h) about 200 mi (325 km) south of the southern tip of the Baja California peninsula.
- 18:00 UTC (11:00 a.m. PDT) at 20.5°N 109.7°W – Hurricane Flossie attains a minimum barometric pressure of 978 mbar (28.88 inHg) about 165 mi (270 km) south of the southern tip of the Baja California peninsula.

==== August 12 ====
- 06:00 UTC (11:00 p.m. PDT, August 11) at 24.2°N 114.9°W – Hurricane Flossie weakens into a tropical storm about 330 mi (530 km) west-northwest of the southern tip of the Baja California peninsula.

==== August 13 ====
- 06:00 UTC (11:00 p.m. PDT, August 12) at 24.7°N 118.0°W – Tropical Storm Flossie weakens into a tropical depression about 525 mi (845 km) west-northwest of the southern tip of the Baja California peninsula.

==== August 14 ====
- 00:00 UTC (5:00 p.m. PDT, August 13) at 24.7°N 119.2°W – Tropical Depression Flossie is last noted as a tropical cyclone about 600 mi (965 km) west-northwest of the southern tip of the Baja California peninsula; it dissipates shortly thereafter.

==== August 20 ====
- 18:00 UTC (11:00 a.m. PDT) at 15.5°N 99.1°W – A tropical depression forms from an area of low pressure about 110 mi (175 km) south-southeast of Acapulco, Guerrero.

==== August 21 ====
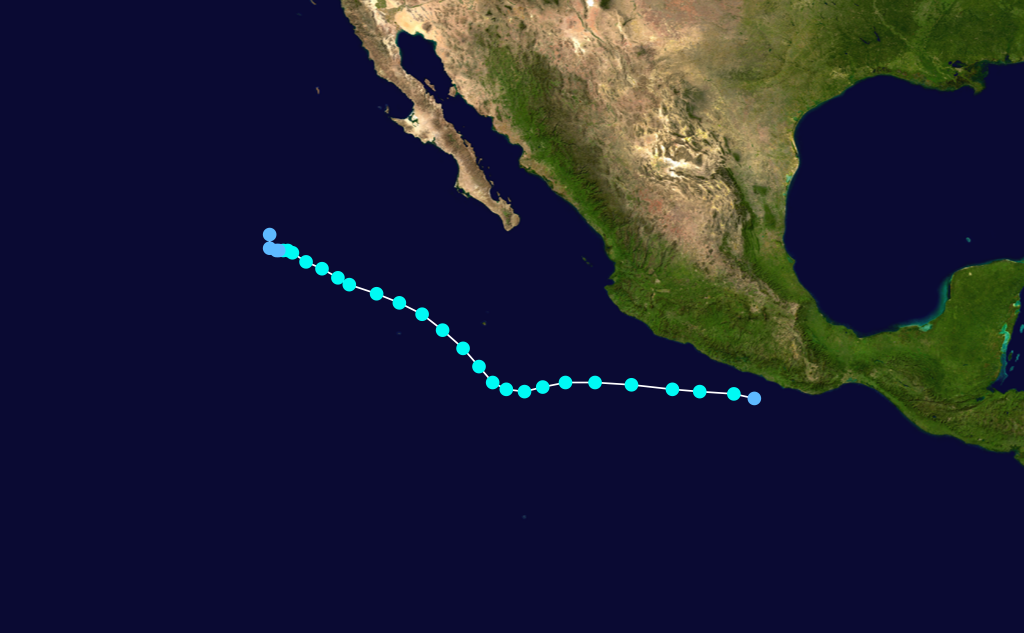
Storm path of Tropical Storm Gil

- 00:00 UTC (5:00 p.m. PDT, August 20) at 15.7°N 100.0°W – The aforementioned tropical depression strengthens into Tropical Storm Gil about 80 mi (130 km) south of Acapulco, Guerrero.

==== August 24 ====
- 12:00 UTC (5:00 a.m. PDT) at 19.7°N 114.7°W – Tropical Storm Gil attains peak winds of 65 mph (100 km/h) about 990 mi (1,595 km) west of Acapulco, Guerrero.
- 18:00 UTC (11:00 a.m. PDT) at 20.1°N 115.7°W – Tropical Storm Gil attains a minimum barometric pressure of 993 mbar (29.32 inHg) about 1,060 mi (1,705 km) west-northwest of Acapulco, Guerrero.

==== August 26 ====
- 18:00 UTC (11:00 a.m. PDT) at 22.0°N 120.0°W – Tropical Storm Gil weakens into a tropical depression about 1,360 mi (2,185 km) west-northwest of Acapulco, Guerrero.

==== August 27 ====
- 12:00 UTC (5:00 a.m. PDT) at 22.7°N 120.4°W – Tropical Depression Gil is last noted as a tropical cyclone about 1,395 mi (2,240 km) west-northwest of Acapulco, Guerrero; it dissipates six hours later.

=== September ===
==== September 1 ====
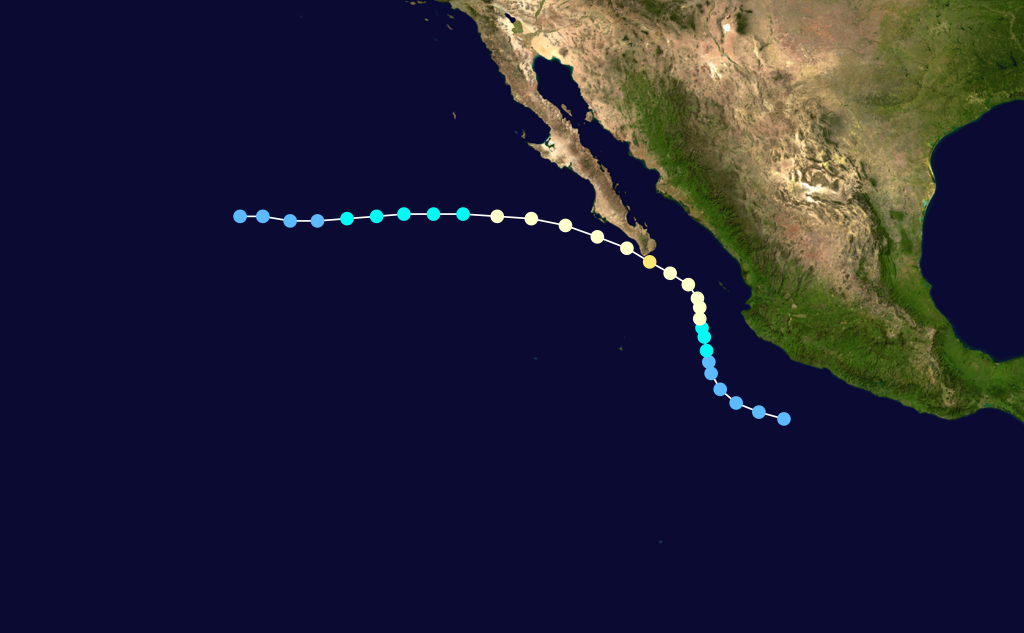
Storm path of Hurricane Henriette

- 00:00 UTC (5:00 p.m. PDT, August 31) at 15.7°N 103.8°W – A tropical depression forms from a tropical wave about 175 mi (280 km) off the coast of Mexico, or about 355 mi (575 km) south-southeast of Puerto Vallarta, Jalisco.

==== September 2 ====
- 12:00 UTC (5:00 a.m. PDT) at 18.7°N 107.2°W – The aforementioned tropical depression strengthens into Tropical Storm Henriette about 185 mi (295 km) southwest of Puerto Vallarta, Jalisco.

==== September 3 ====
- 06:00 UTC (11:00 p.m. PDT, September 2) at 20.1°N 107.5°W – Tropical Storm Henriette strengthens into a Category 1 hurricane about 150 mi (240 km) west-southwest of Puerto Vallarta, Jalisco.

==== September 4 ====
- 12:00 UTC (5:00 a.m. PDT) at 22.6°N 109.7°W – Hurricane Henriette strengthens to Category 2 intensity about 25 mi (35 km) southeast of the southern tip of the Baja California peninsula; it simultaneously attains peak winds of 100 mph (155 km/h) and a minimum barometric pressure of 970 mbar (28.64 inHg).
- 15:00 UTC (8:00 a.m. PDT) at 22.8°N 109.9°W – Hurricane Henriette makes landfall at peak intensity on the southern tip of the Baja California peninsula; it emerges back over the Pacific Ocean shortly thereafter.
- 18:00 UTC (11:00 a.m. PDT) at 23.2°N 110.7°W – Hurricane Henriette weakens to Category 1 intensity about 50 mi (85 km) west-northwest of the southern tip of the Baja California peninsula.

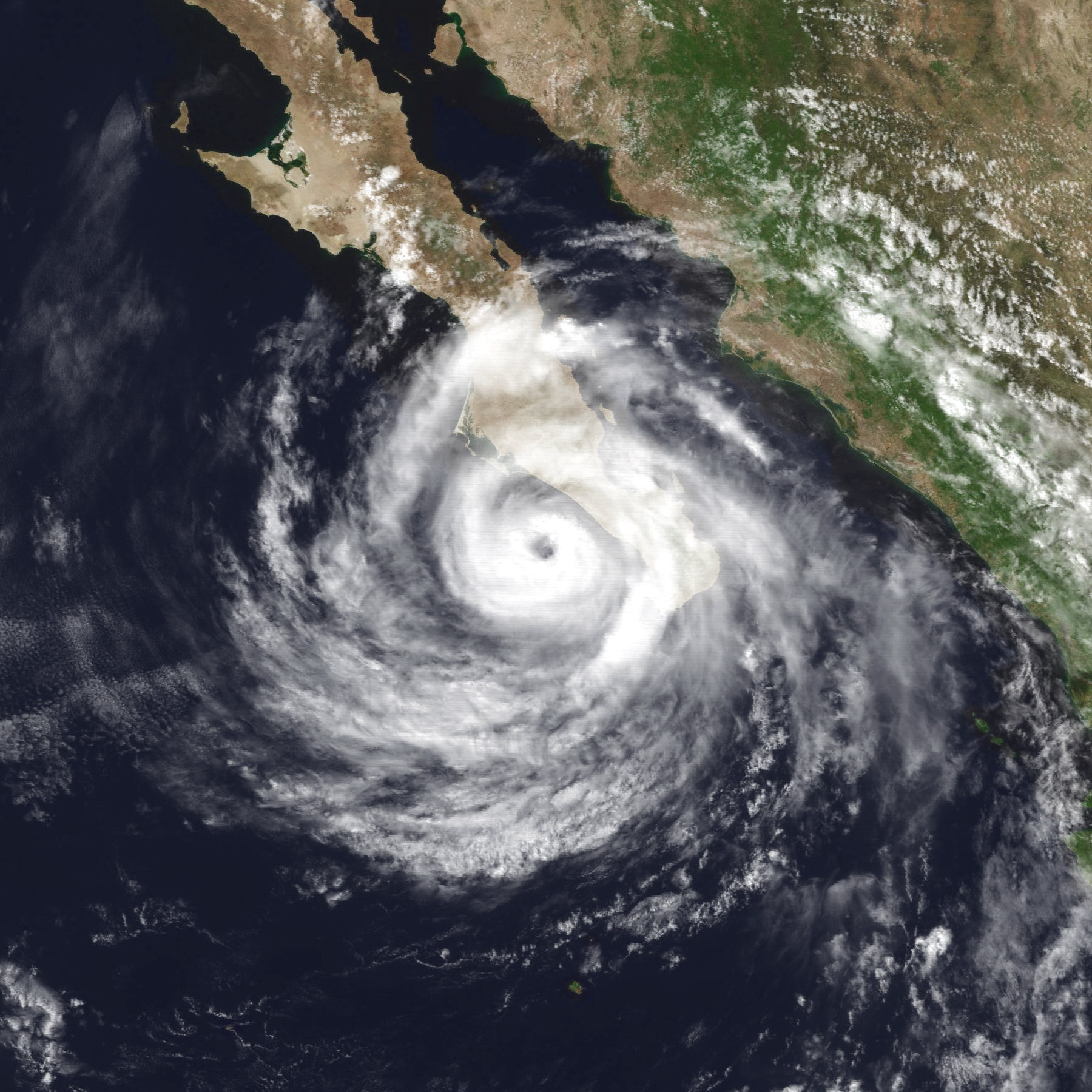
Satellite image of Hurricane Henriette late on September 4, a few hours after striking the Baja California peninsula

==== September 6 ====
- 00:00 UTC (5:00 p.m. PDT, September 5) at 24.7°N 117.9°W – Hurricane Henriette weakens into a tropical storm about 520 mi (835 km) west-northwest of the southern tip of the Baja California peninsula.

==== September 7 ====
- 06:00 UTC (11:00 p.m. PDT, September 6) at 24.4°N 124.3°W – Tropical Storm Henriette weakens into a tropical depression about 915 mi (1,475 km) west of the southern tip of the Baja California peninsula.

==== September 8 ====
- 00:00 UTC (5:00 p.m. PDT, September 7) at 24.6°N 127.7°W – Tropical Depression Henriette is last noted as a tropical cyclone about 1,130 mi (1,815 km) west of the southern tip of the Baja California peninsula; it dissipates six hours later.

==== September 12 ====
- 18:00 UTC (11:00 a.m. PDT) at 14.8°N 106.7°W – A tropical depression forms from an area of unsettled weather about 335 mi (535 km) south-southwest of Manzanillo, Colima.

==== September 13 ====
- 00:00 UTC (5:00 p.m. PDT, September 12) at 15.4°N 107.1°W – The aforementioned tropical depression strengthens into Tropical Storm Ismael about 310 mi (500 km) southwest of Manzanillo, Colima.

==== September 14 ====
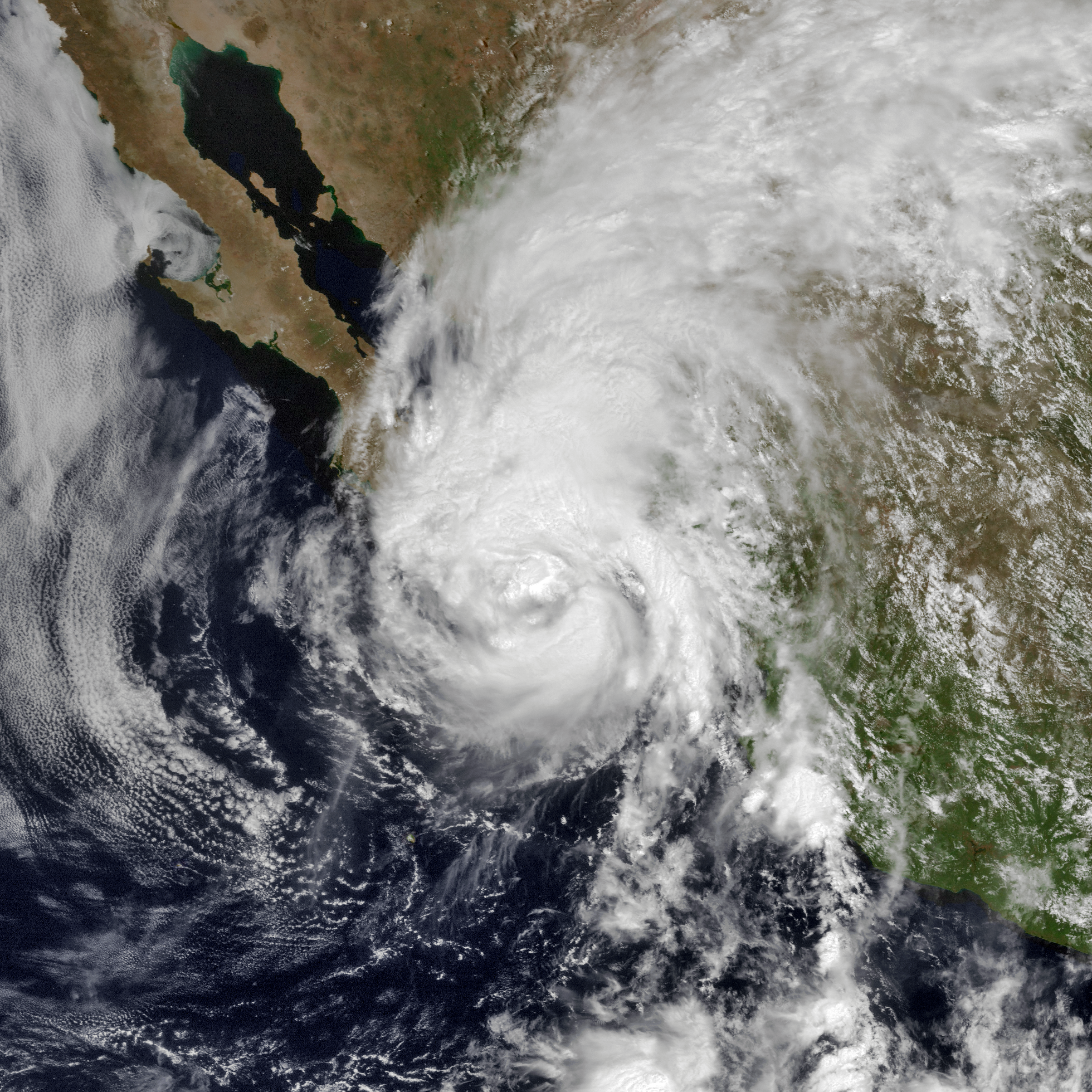
Satellite image of Hurricane Ismael approaching Mexico near peak intensity on September 14

- 06:00 UTC (11:00 p.m. PDT, September 13) at 19.4°N 108.2°W – Tropical Storm Ismael strengthens into a Category 1 hurricane about 265 mi (425 km) south-southeast of the southern tip of the Baja California peninsula.
- 12:00 UTC (5:00 a.m. PDT) at 20.8°N 108.5°W – Hurricane Ismael attains peak winds of 80 mph (130 km/h) and a minimum barometric pressure of 983 mbar (29.03 inHg) about 175 mi (280 km) southeast of the southern tip of the Baja California peninsula.

==== September 15 ====
- 04:00 UTC (9:00 p.m. PDT, September 14) at 25.6°N 109.1°W – Hurricane Ismael makes landfall near Topolobampo, Sinaloa, with winds of 80 mph (130 km/h) and a barometric pressure of 988 mbar (29.18 inHg).
- 06:00 UTC (11:00 p.m. PDT, September 14) at 16.2°N 109.1°W – Hurricane Ismael weakens into a tropical storm inland about 40 mi (65 km) north of Topolobampo, Sinaloa.
- 18:00 UTC (11:00 a.m. PDT) at 30.5°N 109.0°W – Tropical Storm Ismael weakens into a tropical depression inland about 340 mi (545 km) north of Topolobampo, Sinaloa; it dissipates within the next six hours over the Sierra Madre Occidental.

==== September 16 ====
- 18:00 UTC (11:00 a.m. PDT) at 14.8°N 105.0°W – Tropical Depression Eleven-E forms from a tropical wave about 300 mi (480 km) south of Manzanillo, Colima.

==== September 17 ====
- 12:00 UTC (5:00 a.m. PDT) at 15.6°N 106.7°W – Tropical Depression Eleven-E strengthens into Tropical Storm Juliette about 290 mi (465 km) southwest of Manzanillo, Colima.

==== September 18 ====
- 12:00 UTC (5:00 a.m. PDT) at 16.3°N 108.6°W – Tropical Storm Juliette strengthens into a Category 1 hurricane about 340 mi (545 km) southwest of Manzanillo, Colima.
- 18:00 UTC (11:00 a.m. PDT) at 16.4°N 109.1°W – Hurricane Juliette strengthens to Category 2 intensity about 365 mi (585 km) west-southwest of Manzanillo, Colima.

==== September 19 ====
- 00:00 UTC (5:00 p.m. PDT, September 18) at 16.6°N 109.4°W – Hurricane Juliette strengthens to Category 3 intensity about 375 mi (600 km) west-southwest of Manzanillo, Colima, making it the third and final major hurricane of the season.

==== September 20 ====
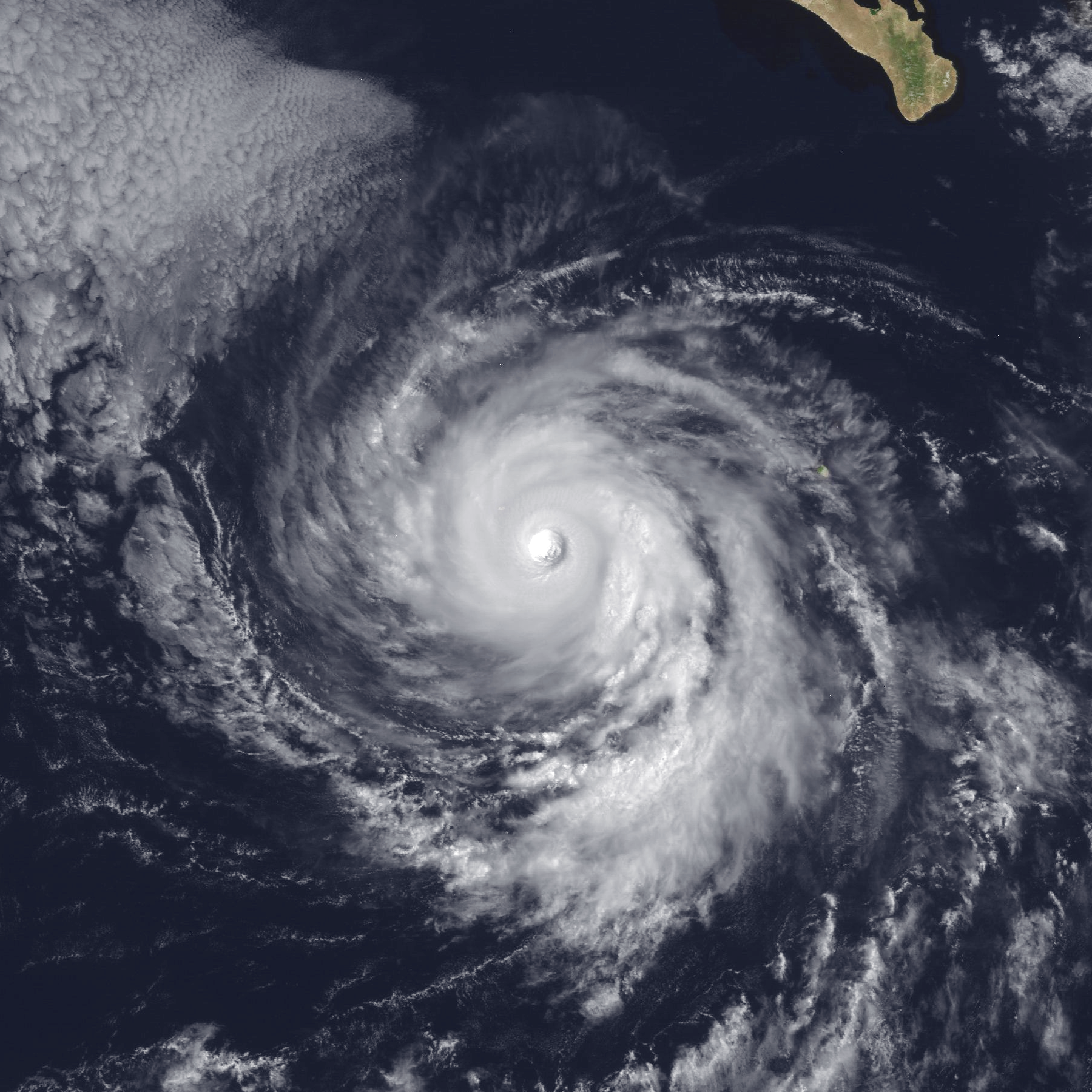
Satellite image of Hurricane Juliette near peak intensity on September 20

- 06:00 UTC (11:00 p.m. PDT, September 19) at 17.8°N 112.4°W – Hurricane Juliette strengthens to Category 4 intensity about 385 mi (620 km) south-southwest of the southern tip of the Baja California peninsula.
- 12:00 UTC (5:00 a.m. PDT) at 17.8°N 113.5°W – Hurricane Juliette attains peak winds of 150 mph (240 km/h) and a minimum barometric pressure of 930 mbar (27.46 inHg) about 420 mi (675 km) southwest of the southern tip of the Baja California peninsula, making it the strongest storm of the season.

==== September 21 ====
- 06:00 UTC (11:00 p.m. PDT, September 20) at 18.2°N 115.3°W – Hurricane Juliette weakens to Category 3 intensity about 470 mi (760 km) southwest of the southern tip of the Baja California peninsula.
- 18:00 UTC (11:00 a.m. PDT) at 18.5°N 116.5°W – Hurricane Juliette weakens to Category 2 intensity about 520 mi (835 km) southwest of the southern tip of the Baja California peninsula.

==== September 23 ====
- 00:00 UTC (5:00 p.m. PDT, September 22) at 19.6°N 119.2°W – After weakening to a low-end Category 2 hurricane with winds of 100 mph (155 km/h), Hurricane Juliette restrengthens slightly to attain secondary peak winds of 105 mph (165 km/h), along with a barometric pressure of 970 mbar (28.64 inHg), about 640 mi (1,030 km) west-southwest of the southern tip of the Baja California peninsula.

==== September 24 ====
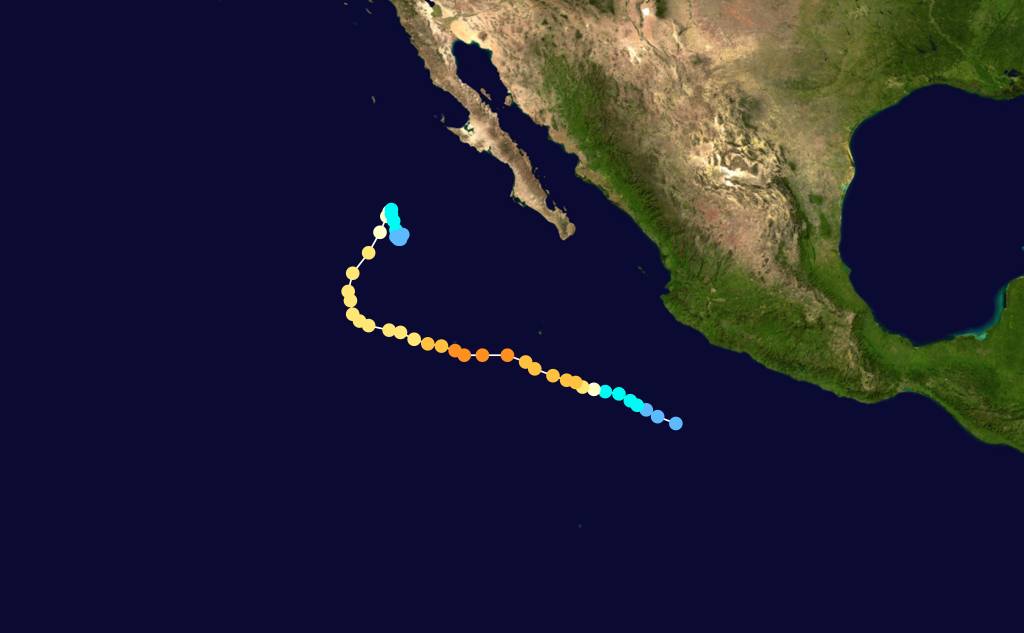
Storm path of Hurricane Juliette

- 06:00 UTC (11:00 p.m. PDT, September 23) at 23.2°N 118.0°W – Hurricane Juliette weakens to Category 1 intensity about 510 mi (825 km) west of the southern tip of the Baja California peninsula.

==== September 25 ====
- 00:00 UTC (5:00 p.m. PDT, September 24) at 24.2°N 117.5°W – Hurricane Juliette weakens into a tropical storm about 485 mi (780 km) west of the southern tip of the Baja California peninsula.

==== September 26 ====
- 00:00 UTC (5:00 p.m. PDT, September 25) at 23.0°N 117.3°W – Tropical Storm Juliette weakens into a tropical depression about 465 mi (750 km) west of the southern tip of the Baja California peninsula.
- 18:00 UTC (11:00 a.m. PDT) at 23.1°N 117.0°W – Tropical Depression Juliette is last noted as a tropical cyclone about 450 mi (725 km) west of the southern tip of the Baja California peninsula; it dissipates within the next six hours.

=== October ===
- No tropical cyclones were active in October.

=== November ===
- No tropical cyclones were active in November.

==== November 30 ====
- The 1995 Pacific hurricane season officially ends.

== See also ==
- Timeline of the 1995 Atlantic hurricane season
- List of Pacific hurricanes
- Pacific hurricane season
- Tropical cyclones in 1995
