= Fourth Battle of Topolobampo =

1914 battle

- Part of the Mexican Revolution
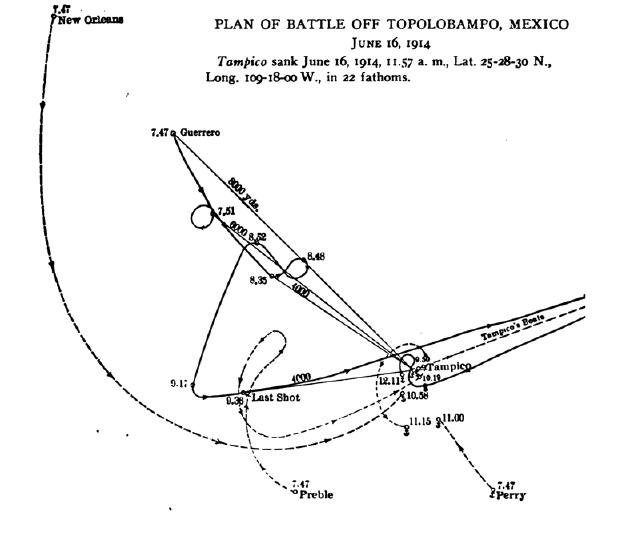
- Map of the Fourth Battle of Topolobampo, drawn by the U.S. Navy observers during the battle.
Date	June 16, 1914
Location	off Topolobampo, Sinaloa, Mexico
Result	Huertista victory

Belligerents
(Mexico) Constitutionalists	(Mexico) Huertistas

Commanders and leaders
Captain Hilario Malpica†	Captain Navio Torres

Strength
1 gunboat	1 gunboat

Casualties and losses
7 killed, ~30 wounded, unknown captured, 1 gunboat sunk	Unknown wounded, 1 gunboat damaged
- Both federal and rebel forces flew the same Mexican National Ensign during the naval campaign off Topolobampo.

The Fourth Battle of Topolobampo was a single ship action fought during the Mexican Revolution and the last naval battle of the Topolobampo Campaign. In June 1914, a Huertista gunboat sank a Constitutionalist gunboat off Topolobampo, Sinaloa in the Gulf of California.

== Background ==
After the Third Battle of Topolobampo and the first sinking of the Constitutionalist gunboat Tampico, rebel sailors under Captain Hilario Malpica raised their ship, which had been partially submerged behind Shell Point, at the mouth of Topolobampo Bay. Several United States Navy ships were in the area, observing the campaign. Flagship USS California, USS New Orleans, USS Preble and USS Perry were all present and were under the Pacific Fleet commander Rear Admiral Thomas B. Howard in California. USS Yorktown was also in the area. Much of the campaign is remembered by Rear Admiral Howard's and his officer's reports of the battles.

On June 11, 1914, Tampico was sighted by Howard when off Mazatlán while commanding his flagship. On Sunday, June 14, 1914, Howard received a report that Tampico was steaming away from Topolobampo to Altata. He ordered the destroyer USS Preble, under Lieutenant Junior Grade Vance Duncan Chapline, to find Tampico and follow her. Preble immediately got underway at about 3:30 pm. From Mazatlán, she steamed north toward Topolobampo. The destroyer Perry, which was off La Paz, was ordered to head for Topolobampo and report to Preble for further instructions with her radio. Preble's commander, did not know what course or speed Tampico was making, so he slowly proceeded to Topolobampo, hoping to sight the ship at around daylight the next morning.

At roughly 7:30 am on June 15, Tampico was sighted to the west at latitude 25° 14' north, longitude 109° 01' west. Preble approached to within two miles of Tampico and stopped. Tampico's crew spotted Preble and also stopped. A few moments later, a lifeboat was dropped and a Mexican officer named Rebatet boarded Preble and presented the compliments of Captain Malpica. Rebatet also told Lieutenant Chapline how Tampico had been underwater for two months as result of the third action off Topolobampo. On June 14, Tampico left Topolobampo under one boiler and proceeded to sea en route to Altata, Mexico. There Captain Malpica expected to retube Tampico's boilers and improve the quality of her machinery.

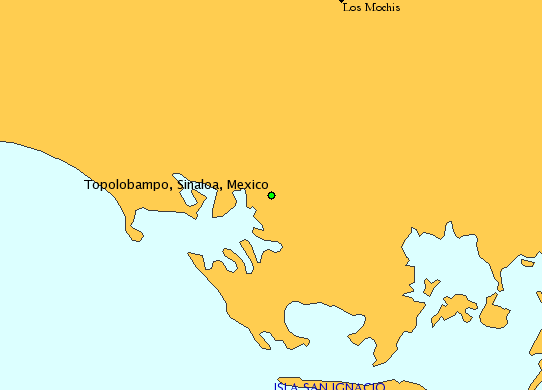
A map of Topolobampo Bay and surroundings.

From there, Malpica's mission would be to attack the Huerista gunboat Guerrero, operating out of Guaymas. After destroying the Guerrero, Tampico would begin a commerce raiding campaign against targets along the west coast of Mexico. Tampico had steamed only thirty miles when her one remaining boiler had burned out of action, rendering the Constitutionalist sailors stranded with no means of propulsion. Repairs to the boiler were attempted, but proved fruitless, eventually Captain Malpica requested that the American destroyer tow Tampico into Altata, eighty miles away. By this time, USS Perry had arrived, so Lieutenant Chapline was forced to deny Malpica's request, as doing so would have violated American neutrality. The Mexicans then asked Chapline to send a radio message to Rear Admiral Howard. Captain Malpica also asked if Preble's commander would come to see him. Preble's radioman sent the message as requested.

At about 5:30 pm, Chapline boarded Tampico. At the time, Malpica's leg was covered in bandages; a week or so earlier, he had accidentally fired his revolver into his foot and could barely walk during the final battle. The captain was happy to learn that a message had been sent to Rear Admiral Howard and invited the Americans to inspect the poor condition Tampico was in. The U.S. Navy officers inspected the Mexican gunboat, which was armed with two 4-inch (102 mm) guns, two 6-pounder (3 kg) guns and one machine gun on the bridge. Tampico had a raised deck forward and aft, each of which mounted one of the 4-inch rapid-fire guns. Four other 6-pounder guns were originally part of Tampico's armament, but they had been removed before the campaign. The rebels expected trouble with the 4-inch guns; upon examination, the Americans discovered that their breech block hinges were loose, the rifling badly eroded, and much movement was lost as a result of the training- and elevating-gears, being covered in filth from being underwater. Furthermore, the rear gun sights could not be lined up with the front sights.

The two 6-pounders appeared to be in fine condition. About 100 to 200 4-inch armor-piercing, blind and shrapnel shells were available, but most were weathered though due to exposure to the elements or from being submerged in Topolobampo Bay. The 6-pounders had plenty of ammunition, but again the shells were in bad shape and dangerous to fire. Crates of small arms ammunition littered the vessel, some whole and filled with ammo, others splintered to pieces. The whole crates were stacked on the bridge and inside the captain's quarters. Among the debris, three cows roamed the hold, adding to the mess. The engines were in a bad state, covered in rust. The generator had been destroyed by salt water, meaning no lights could be used and Tampico's crew had to use lanterns at night. The two boilers were "dead"; the fronts of the casings were missing, along with the hand-hole plates. Tubes inside the boilers were visible; salt crystals hung from them – the steam piping, the fresh-water piping, and the gauges. About 500 tubes needed plugging, according to the Mexican engineers. The rebels improvised with wooden table legs to plug the holes.

Many of Tampico's crew wore bandages over their wounds from previous engagements. Beside Captain Malpica, the crew consisted an executive officer, a chief engineer, and an assistant engineer with three machinists. Twenty-nine sailors were aboard, with a reinforcement of twenty-five rebel soldiers, to make up for the missing Tampico crew members, for a total of sixty-one men. The American captain informed Malpica that a radio response from Howard was not likely to happen that day, so the U.S. sailors went back to their ship. Tampico would be sunk before the Americans received a response.

Guerrero was armed with six 4-inch guns and had an unknown number of crewmen. She was commanded by Captain Navio Torres of the Mexican Navy. When the American commander asked Malpica what he would do when he encountered Guerrero, he replied, "I'll fight her and sink her if she will only come within range of my guns."

At 8:00 pm that night, Chapline intercepted a radio communique from USS New Orleans, under Commander Noble E. Irwin, to Rear Admiral Howard. The message stated that New Orleans was shadowing Guerrero as she headed south from Guaymas straight for Tampico. With this information, the Americans were able to estimate when Guerrero and New Orleans would arrive: around 7:00 am the following morning. Tampico was in terrible shape for her last battle; also, sometime during the same night of June 15, she drifted over a shoal and ran aground. It was at this position, latitude 25° 28' 30" north, longitude 109° 18' west, that Guerrero would sink Tampico for a final time. Perry and Prebble's commanders were ordered to simply wait for Guerrero and New Orleans and to report every event of the battle, but assist neither side. This meant that the Americans were not able to warn Tampico of the incoming Guerrero, as it apparently would violate their neutrality.

== Battle ==
Just before daylight, June 16, 1914, the two American destroyers and Tampico sighted two fast-approaching vessels to the north. The weather was well, clear skies and warm air with just a slight breeze; the California Gulf was very calm. At around 5:30 am the two ships were identified as Guerrero and USS New Orleans. Guerrero came to a halt and cleared for action and at about 7:00 am, began her advance towards Tampico. Tampico's Mexican National Ensign was hoisted and life boats lowered on the unengaged starboard side, reportedly the only preparations the rebels made before the action. The Huerista gunboat raised her flag, which was identical to Tampico's but a little smaller. Tampico commenced the action at 7:47 am by firing her 4-inch guns at the now stationary Guerrero.

Tampico's shots fell 400 yards (370 m) short and Guerrero fired back with one gun; her shots hit the water 1,000 yards (910 m) over Tampico. A gunnery battle at a range of 8,000 yards (7,300 m) continued for many moments. The crews of the American vessels were very excited according to Lieutenant Chapline and predominantly in favor of Tampico, not because of the political situation but because the Americans knew of Tampico's poor condition. The Americans covered the decks of their ships and climbed onto the rigging to observe with binoculars. Whenever one of Tampico's shells fell near Guerrero, the Americans would cheer and whenever Tampico was hit they would groan and criticize the bad gunnery of both Tampico and Guerrero. The battle initially continued for about an hour before either side made any hits. The American quartermaster aboard Preble joked by saying that

"Those boobs on the Tampico will starve to death before the Guerrero hits her."

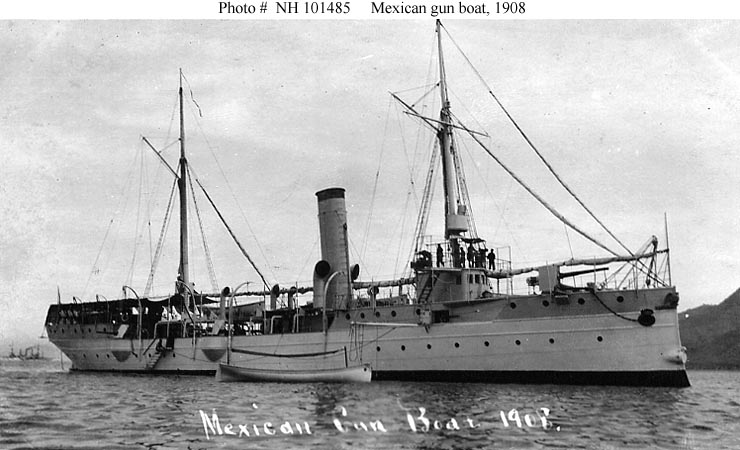
Tampico in 1908

Throughout the engagement, Preble steamed back and forth, in between the two fighting Mexican gunboats. Whenever the Guerrero came about the Americans would follow each of her movements but never interfered as they remained one to two miles away from Guerrero at all times. Eventually most of Tampico's guns were in action, her two 4-inch guns and starboard 6-pounder. The machine gun mounted on the bridge was never used, as was the same for the portside 6-pounder. Guerrero never came within range of small arms and never maneuvered to Tampico's port; she used all of her 4-inch guns. Lieutenant Chapline ordered a yeoman to stand near him during the action, with a stopwatch, pad and pencil. The yeoman's orders were to write down every event and the times in which they occurred. The gunnery of both Mexican gunboats was reported as being very "erratic". Later during the battle, while observing Tampico, the crew of Preble discovered that the Constitutionalist gunners would actually line up for a shot on Guerrero, then lie down and pull the firing lanyard, making no attempt to properly aim the guns.

The same procedure was used by the gunners of Guerrero according to Prebles' crew but this was contradicted by the Lieutenant Chapline's, who said he could see the gun pointers just before Guerrero fired. At 7:51 am the range reduced a little so the Guerrero changed course to starboard and away from the Tampico. At 8:02 Guerrero stopped for a moment with her starboard broadside aimed at Tampico and fired; the range was around 6,000 yards (5,500 m); still neither Mexican gunboat inflicted a hit on the other. Many of Tampico's shells were falling about 3,000 yards (2,700 m) in front of Guerrero, the Americans deemed this as result of water-damaged ammunition or the dirty elevating gears on the 4-inch guns. When at 8:20 am, Guerrero came about again, presented her port broadside to Tampico before firing another. The Americans reported that the rate of firing increased at that time but all shells were falling short of target. At 8:22 am Guerrero began advancing towards Tampico slowly, at 8:24 am she made her first hit after well over a half an hour of fighting. The round hit the main deck between the poop and the main mast. A big cloud of white smoke confirmed the hit, but Tampico appeared to have suffered no serious damage. This shell was shrapnel, after the sea action, the Americans learned that Guerrero fired primarily shrapnel rounds during the combat.

The rate of fire decreased a little at this point and no further hits were made by either side for some moments. At 8:34 one of the lifeboats, attached to Tampico's starboard, came loose and went adrift. A minute later, Guerrero advanced to a range of 4,000 yards (3,700 m) and then changed course to port, away from Tampico. This was the closest the two warships came to each other; it is believed that at this range, Tampico scored two hits on Guerrero. Both hits inflicted no major damage though. Guerrero came about once more at 8:40 am and a few minutes later, scored her second hit. This shell struck Tampico's gafif which pulled down the large Mexican flag. Again there was no major damage to the ship but morale was indeed hurt aboard Tampico. Two minutes later, at 8:50 am, Guerrero turned around, away from Tampico, then came back around and presented her portside battery at a range of 5,000 yards (4,600 m). Guerrero fired and from this point on, several additional rounds struck Tampico. The Americans noted that at this time Guerrero was firing at the rate of two shots per minutes with her 4-guns and Tampico fired at the rate of one shot every two minutes with three of her guns.

As Tampico only had 100 to 200 4-inch rounds at the start of hostilities, they concluded that Captain Malpica may have been preserving his armour piercing shells for when Guerrero came within close range. Two additional lifeboats went adrift at 9:01 am, a few minutes later Guerrero began to fire salvos. One of the salvos was sighted as hitting the water 500 yards (460 m) over Tampico, another 1,000 yards (910 m) over and a final, 2,000 yards (1,800 m) over target. None of the shots hit. Guerrero was still heading for Tampico at 9:14 am when she slowed down and fired some more before coming about to port again at 9:17 am. Lieutenant Chapline, after the action, discovered that Tampico was hit more often than what he and his crew were able to observe. One hit at the starboard bow, close to the unused 6-pounder gun, and exploded within the forecastle. Another struck near the portside 4-inch gun, which apparently damaged the weapon as it was not fired again after about 9:10. When 9:18 am came, a shrapnel shell exploded just in front of Tampico. This shell did not seem to harm Malpica's gunboat but the metal fragments killed some of the crew members, standing on deck.

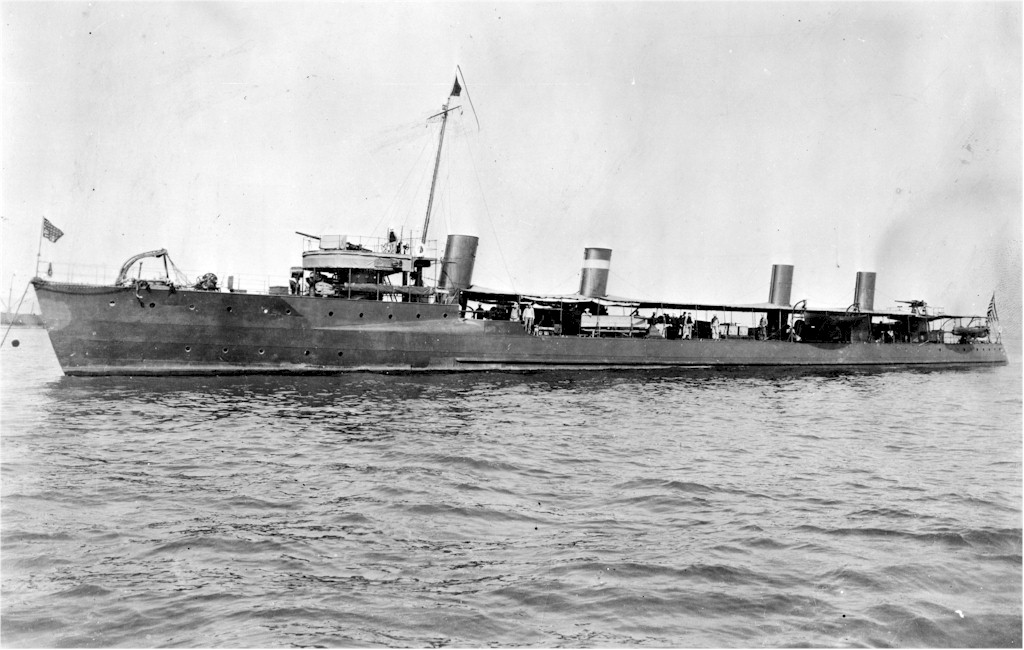
USS Preble

A few minutes later smoke and fire was seen on Tampico's quarterdeck. No attempt was made to extinguish the flames, Tampico's boilers were broken so no pressure was available to push water out of the fire-mains. At 9:42, Captain Malpica ordered his crew to abandon ship. At 9:45 the flames on Tampico's quarterdeck grew larger and much smoke began to cover Tampico. Men aboard the rebel gunboat continued to fire the remaining 4-inch gun as the others left their ship. One of the gunners took up the large Mexican ensign and held it up with his hand until all of the other crew members were safely in life boats. Guerrero continued shooting until 9:50 am when the battle ended.Tampico's crew, in their boats, began to head for shore so Guerrero proceeded at full speed for the lifeboats in order to capture the rebels before they could reach shoal water and escape. Preble took the time to proceed to Tampico to give aid to the crewmen that remained aboard the ship.

Preble came within 50 yards (46 m) of Tampico, there her crew witnessed several Mexicans running around on deck waving white rags as a sign of surrender. The men climbed all the way down the anchor cable but refused to jump into the water in order to swim to the American destroyer. During all of this, the fire was spreading aboard Tampico and began to start setting off the crates of small arms ammunition. A moment after that the fire reached the powder magazine; a large explosion ensued and 4-inch shells were launched in "every direction" according to Lieutenant Chapline. Some of the shots passed through Preble's rigging. USS New Orleans lowered two boats and sent them to pick up the rest of Tampico's crew, six men. The last man rescued was Tampico's paymaster, Rebatet, who was found by Guerrero, severely wounded and holding onto a wooden plank of wreckage.

== Aftermath ==
After about thirty minutes of pursuit, Guerrero caught up with the two boats filled with Tampico's crew. There were no more chances to escape so Captain Malpica ordered his boats to Guerrero's side for a surrender. While the rebel sailors were climbing up Guerrero's ladder, Captain Hilario Malpica, stood up within his launch, removed his revolver from his side, placed it calmly to his head and fired. Immediately Captain Torres of Guerrero ordered his flag at half mast to honor the now dead Captain Malpica, the American vessels did the same. When the fighting was well over, Lieutenant Chapline learned from Captain Torres that Malpica was a well-respected man, despite his mutiny months earlier. Malpica had served with many of Guerrero's crew members, prior to his mutiny. Captain Torres sent a radio message to Commander Irwin of New Orleans, thanking the United States Navy warships for half-masting their colors for the sake of Malpica. After taking an unknown number of prisoners, Guerrero returned to a position 400 yards (370 m) south of the burning Tampico. Guerrero anchored and boats were sent to Tampico with the intention of investigating her condition.

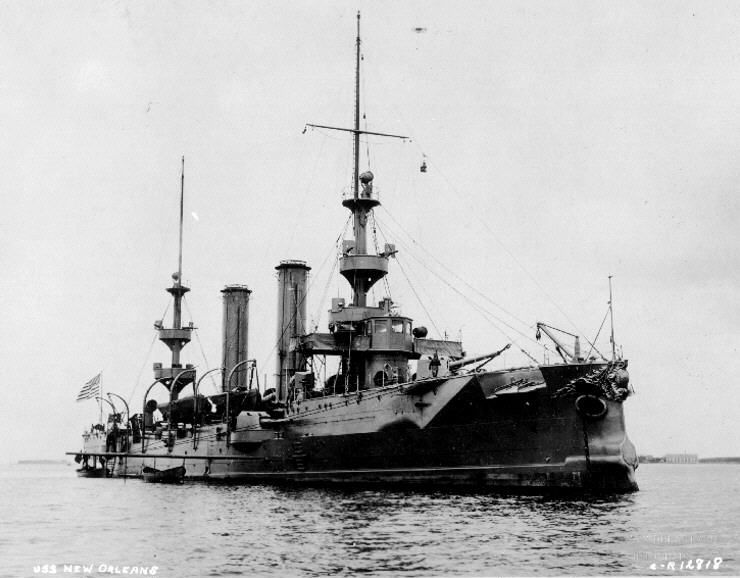
USS New Orleans

A tow-line was passed from the stern of Guerrero to Tampico's bow but Tampico was in no condition to be salvaged so the tow-line was later cut and Tampico finished sinking to the bottom. By 12:00 am, Tampico was fully submerged under 22 fathoms (132 ft; 40 m) of water. A U.S. Navy medic helped tend to an unknown number of wounded crewmen aboard Guerrero; two shot-holes were also observed by the Americans when they went aboard Guerrero. Captain Torres also informed Lieutenant Chapline that he ordered his crew to fire high, in hopes of killing Tampico's crew without damaging the gunboat. Tampico was hit a total of twelve times during the fight, five shells struck above the waterline and seven underneath. Five men were killed during the battle, excluding Captain Malpica, and another died the following day. Around thirty rebel sailors were wounded, twelve of them seriously. Captain Torres did not request that New Orleans surrender the six men she picked up; they were later transported to the United States and escaped becoming prisoners of war.

== See also ==
- First Battle of Topolobampo
- Second Battle of Topolobampo
- Third Battle of Topolobampo
