= Second Battle of Topolobampo =

- Part of the Mexican Revolution
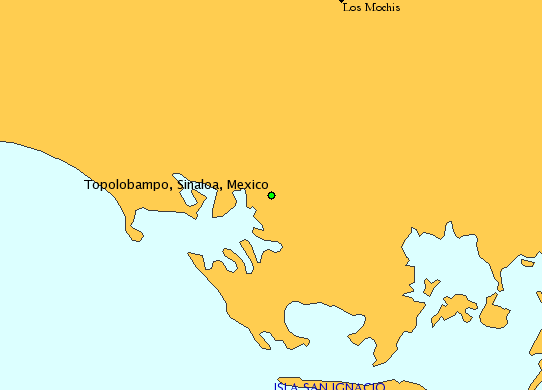
- A map of Topolobampo and Topolobampo Bay. Shell Point is visible, west of Topolobampo, sticking out into the Gulf of California.
Date	March 13, 1914
Location	off Topolobampo, Sinaloa, Mexico
Result	See aftermath

Belligerents
(Mexico) Constitutionalists	(Mexico) Hueristas

Commanders and leaders
Lieutenant Hilario Malpica	Captain Navio Torres

Strength
1 gunboat	2 gunboats

Casualties and losses
None	None
- Both federal and rebel forces flew the same Mexican National Ensign during the naval campaign off Topolobampo.

The Second Battle of Topolobampo was a bloodless naval engagement during the Mexican Revolution. In March 1914, a rebel Constitutionalist gunboat attempted to break the blockade of Topolobampo, Sinaloa in Mexico. The attack forced federal gunboats to a further distance but failed to lift the blockade.

== Battle ==
On March 13, 1914, at 8:50 am, the rebel gunboat Tampico, under Lieutenant Hilario Malpico, stood out for an attack on the federal gunboats, Guerrero and Morelos, commanded by Captain Navio Torres. Tampico was spotted sailing out past the bar and as fast as possible the two federal warships were underway in Tampico's direction. Guerrero fired the first shots at 9:00 am with her gun battery of six 4-inch (102 mm) guns. Just like during the First Battle of Topolobampo, as soon as Tampico cleared Shell Point, she fired her broadside of two 4-inch guns and one 6-pounder (3 kg) gun at Morelos. Her first shot landed about 20 yards (18 m) too short at a range of 9,000 to 10,000 yards (8,200 to 9,100 m); none of the others hit Morelos.

Guerrero and Morelos followed Tampico until stopping so Morelos could return Tampico's broadside with some of her own fire. Morelos fired and then turned about to retreat southwestward; none of her shots hit either. During the retreat, Tampico continued to fire on Morelos which put the American cruiser USS New Orleans, which was observing the battle, in direct line of Tampico's fire. Realizing that he may hit a neutral vessel, Lieutenant Malpica shifted Tampico's fire to Guerrero. Captain Torres in Guerrero, receiving fire again, chose to do the same as Morelos by turning around and fleeing, apparently in fear of Tampico's guns. New Orleans, shifted berth as well, to a safer position in the battle area.

Tampico steamed back to the safe side of the bar and the two federal gunboats anchored farther south than their prior anchorage. All the firing ceased by 9:12 am; Guerrero fired a total of thirteen shells, Morelos nine, and Tampico fired six rounds. The range varied between 9,000 and 10,000 yards and no hits were made. This time the officers of USS New Orleans noted in their log that the gunnery of Tampico was considerably better than that of Guerrero or Morelos.

== Aftermath ==
Ultimately Lieutenant Malpica in Tampico failed to lift the federal blockade, but in the gunnery duel she was able to force Guerrero and Morelos to break off their attack, despite not actually hitting the federal ships with her guns. Tampico won a tactical victory by forcing the federal gunboats away though the federal gunboats continued a naval blockade of Topolobampo. Morelos left for Altata on March 30, a day before the Third Battle of Topolobampo and the sinking of Tampico. Guerrero continued the blockade.

== See also ==
- First Battle of Topolobampo
- Third Battle of Topolobampo
- Fourth Battle of Topolobampo
