= Admiral Irwin =

Admiral Irwin may refer to:

- James C. Irwin (1929–2018), U.S. Navy Coast Guard vice admiral
- John Irwin (admiral) (1832–1901), U.S. Navy rear admiral
- Noble Edward Irwin (1869–1937), U.S. Navy rear admiral
