= Third Battle of Topolobampo =

- Part of the Mexican Revolution
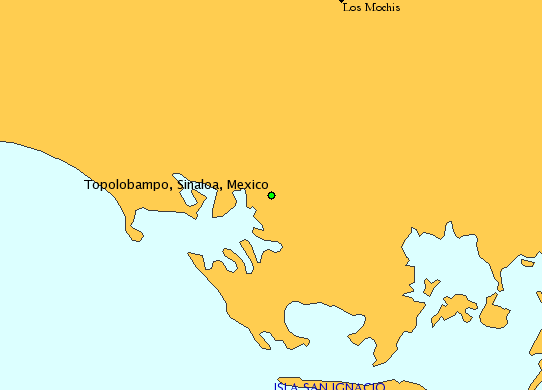
- A map of Topolobampo and Topolobampo Bay. Shell Point is clearly visible, west of Topolobampo, sticking out into the Gulf of California.
Date	March 31, 1914
Location	off Topolobampo, Sinaloa, Mexico
Result	Huertista victory

Belligerents
(Mexico) Constitutionalists	(Mexico) Huertistas

Commanders and leaders
Captain Hilario Malpica	Captain Navio Torres

Strength
1 gunboat	1 gunboat

Casualties and losses
None, 1 gunboat sunk	3 wounded, 1 gunboat damaged
- Both federal and rebel forces flew the same Mexican National Ensign during the naval campaign off Topolobampo.

The Third Battle of Topolobampo was a single ship action during the Mexican Revolution. At the end of March 1914, a Constitutionalist gunboat attempted to break the blockade of Topolobampo, Sinaloa after failing in the First and Second Battles of Topolobampo. The Constitutionalist warship, Tampico, was sunk in a battle lasting a few hours by a Huertista gunboat.

== Background ==
After two small bloodless engagements off Topolobampo within a few weeks earlier, Lieutenant Hilario Malpica was promoted to the rank of captain by General Álvaro Obregón, a future president of Mexico. Despite the promotion, Captain Malpica still had the problem of fighting two gunboats, just outside Topolobampo's harbor bar. Morelos and Guerrero, under Captain Navio Torres aboard Guerrero, were conducting a naval blockade of the port. Guerrero had blockaded Topolobampo continually since March 2, 1914. Morelos arrived a couple days after Guerrero and occasionally left the blockade for provisioning and coal. On March 30, Morelos left again for supplies, leaving Guerrero alone and outside the bar. This gave Captain Malpica a chance to finally lift the blockade of his home port.

== Battle ==
At 4:32 pm on March 31, 1914, the day after Morelos left, Tampico steamed out of the harbor and attacked Guerrero. At this time, Captain Navio Torres was returning an official call from the United States protected cruiser, USS New Orleans, who was observing the naval campaign off Topolobampo. Tampico's fire from two 4-inch (102 mm) guns and one 6-pounder (3 kg) gun failed to hit the target but were not far off. Guerrero returned with six 4-inch guns and quickly New Orleans turned towards the Huertista vessel and got under way immediately; she was too close for safely observing the conflict. Guerrero took up a position off the channel with her broadside towards Tampico. At around 5:30 pm, Captain Malpica in Tampico reached a position abreast of Shell Point. There she opened fire on Guerrero again at a range of 9,000 yards (8,200 m).

Immediately she was answered by Guerrero's broadsides; shots managed to hit the officers quarters twice, causing considerable damage. Tampico suffered four more hits to her bow, and one struck underneath the waterline. Five other shots struck Tampico at the waterline, one amidship. Amazingly neither Captain Malpica or any of her sixty other officers and crew sustained injuries. All of the said hits reportedly occurred while Tampico made the first dash towards Guerrero. Despite the damage, the ships continued to fire at this position until 6:00 pm came before turning around. After a few more moments Tampico got underway again and headed straight for Guerrero, as she had when Captain Malpica mutinied from the squadron. Tampico went right on over the bar and proceeded until grounding below the entrance of the harbor. By 6:15 pm, Tampico managed to free herself of the bar and headed northwest, again straight for Guerrero and under "wild fire" as USS New Orleans reported.

When almost 6:30 pm, because of the approaching darkness, Captain Navio Torres, in the bridge of Guerrero, retreated but continued to fire shots at Tampico. Guerrero was struck three times by Tampico. One 4-inch armor-piercing shot, entered the starboard side of the berth deck but failed to detonate. Another landed on deck amid ship and also failed to explode. The third and final hit struck a stanchion outside the bridge, this one did explode. Because it struck above the top-side, the crew of Guerrero, scrambling around on top, was hit by shrapnel. None of Guerrero's crew were killed but at least three were wounded. After seeing Guerrero retreat, Tampico followed suit and came about and headed back into Topolobampo's harbor, northeast of Shell Point. It was later discovered by Guerrero's crew that Tampico had sunk as the result of her battle damage.

== Aftermath ==
Both of the vessels had ceased their firing by 6:40 pm because of the coming nightfall. Guerrero anchored off the bar and continued blockading, not realizing Tampico had sunk after entering the bay. Firing on both sides was again reported to be very wild by the Mexicans and the Americans. The range varied from 9,000 to 2,000 yards (8,200 to 1,800 m) away from each other; the range closed when Tampico exited the harbor for her attack. Tampico fired over 160 shells during the fight, from her 4-inch and 6-pounder guns. Guerrero fired 162 4-inch shells, of which 20 were shrapnel rounds and the others armor-piercing shells. Captain Malpica, just before the Fourth Battle of Topolobampo, told the officers of USS New Orleans their perspective of the engagement. USS New Orleans and eventually three other American warships would all have a hand in observing the situation.

On April 2, Morelos returned from Altata and learnt of the battle. The federal gunboats did not know yet but they suspected that Tampico was aground and not sunk, so Captain Torres ordered Morelos to get close to the bar and inspect Tampico. At a range of 8,000 yards (7,300 m), Morelos fired eleven shells at Tampico. Half underwater, Tampico's crew had not yet left her, fired eight shots in response, with no damage inflicted to either side. After finding out that Tampico was sunk and after deciding Tampico was no longer a threat to the federal government, the two Huertista gunboats withdrew from Topolobampo a week or so later but with the intention of continuing a blockade after being resupplied. Tampico would be salvaged by her crew and refloated to fight the Fourth Battle of Topolobampo. On April 9, a Constitutionalist biplane, piloted by Gustavo Salinas Camiña would make history by fighting one of the first naval air actions in history.

== See also ==
- First Battle of Topolobampo
- Second Battle of Topolobampo
- Fourth Battle of Topolobampo
