= First Battle of Topolobampo =

Naval battle during the Mexican Revolution

- Part of the Mexican Revolution
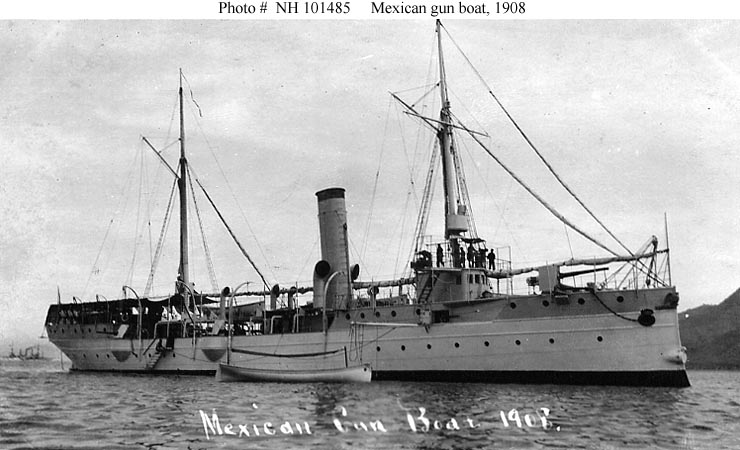
- Tampico in 1908.
Date	March 4, 1914
Location	off Topolobampo, Sinaloa, Mexico
Result	Huerista victory, Constitutionalist gunboat forced to flee into Topolobambpo's harbor.

Belligerents
(Mexico) Constitutionalists	(Mexico) Huertistas

Commanders and leaders
Hilario Malpica	Navio Torres

Strength
1 gunboat	2 gunboats

Casualties and losses
None	None
- Both federal and rebel forces flew the same Mexican National Ensign during the naval campaign off Topolobampo.

The First Battle of Topolobampo was a bloodless engagement and one of the few naval battles of the Mexican Revolution. The small action occurred off Topolobampo, Sinaloa, and involved three gunboats, two from the Mexican Navy and another which mutinied from the armada and joined the rebel Constitutionalists. It was fought on the morning of 4 March 1914, and was the first battle of the naval campaign in the Gulf of California.

== Background ==
=== Guaymas Mutiny ===
On 22 February 1914, off Guaymas, Sonora, a mutiny began at about 8:00 pm when the Mexican Navy gunboat Tampico was refitting for a cruise. Half of the officers and crew were still enjoying shore leave when Executive Officer Lieutenant Hilario Rodríguez Malpica and three other officers began to rally the remaining crew aboard Tampico. The mob of sailors then headed for their captain, whom they arrested with violence. Malpica, who had assumed command of the mutineers, informed Captain Manuel Azueta that he intended to sail Tampico to join the Constitutionalists. (There are various stories about why Lieutenant Malpica resorted to mutiny, however none are known to be true.) Tampico started and intended to head westward.

Just then the Huertista gunboat Guerrero, under Captain Navio Torres, was spotted in front of Tampico. Malpica steamed Tampico straight for Guerrero, hoping to ram and sink her. Unfortunately for Tampico, her steering gear malfunctioned and she was forced to turn around and head for Topolobampo in Sinaloa.

The mutineers transferred Tampico's former captain to a merchant vessel, SS Herrerias, which took him to Mazatlán, which was still in federal hands at the time. Tampico made it to Topolobampo, which became her home port throughout the subsequent naval campaign. Because Tampico was short half of her crew, twenty-five Sinaloan insurgents were ordered to her to become sailors.

== Battle ==
After being humiliated by allowing Tampico to escape and join the rebellion, Captain Navio Torres with Guerrero and another gunboat, Morelos, headed for Topolobampo where they suspected to find the Tampico. Guerrero arrived on 2 March, where she anchored outside the bar and waited for Morelos which would arrive the following day. Tampico was not in sight however; apparently she was conducting a mission against federal Mexican forces elsewhere. So the two gunboats waited in Topolobampo Bay until the next morning; on 4 March, they sighted Tampico as she entered the channel. Guerrero was immediately ordered underway; Morelos followed along Guerrero astern.

Just seconds after lifting anchor, Guerrero opened fire from around 9,000 yards (8,200 m) with her main gun battery. A running battle ensued; Tampico did not stop to fire until after passing Shell Point; once on the other side, she opened fire with her two 4-inch (102 mm) guns and one 6-pounder (3 kg) gun at Guerrero. Tampico had one other 6-pounder gun on board but only the one would be used in the battle. Upon receiving fire, Captain Torres, ordered his ship to maneuver into position for a broadside attack with his six 4-inch guns; Guerrero fired but none of her shots hit their target. At this time Morelos was about 800 yards (730 m) off Guerrero's portside when she opened fire. A gunnery duel continued for sometime; ultimately no hits were made by either side who were firing at each other from a range of 8,000 to 9,000 yards (7,300 to 8,200 m) away.

Guerrero had a better armament than Tampico; Guerrero's guns were in much better condition which gave her a farther range than that of Tampico. This would become a major factor in the coming battles which gave the federals a distinct advantage over the Constitutionalist gunboat. Eventually Tampico made for the protection of Topolobampo's port; she entered past the bar and the fighting ended. The gunboat Guerrero again anchored outside the bar, to initiate a naval blockade while Morelos left for Guaymas for coal and provisions; she would return a few days later.

== Aftermath ==
Throughout the engagement, none of the rounds fired hit their targets. Tampico, according to report, fired far more accurately than the other two gunboats. Of her rounds, one was spotted 50 yards (46 m) short of Guerrero, another 50 yards over, and one more, just off Guerrero's portside. Guerrero fired about twenty rounds that morning, Morelos about seven and Tampico fired fourteen. On 13 March, Tampico would test the federal blockade during another bloodless sea battle known as the Second Battle of Topolobampo.

== See also ==
- Pancho Villa Expedition
- Second Battle of Topolobampo
- Third Battle of Topolobampo
- Fourth Battle of Topolobampo
