= USS Irwin =

Fletcher-class destroyer

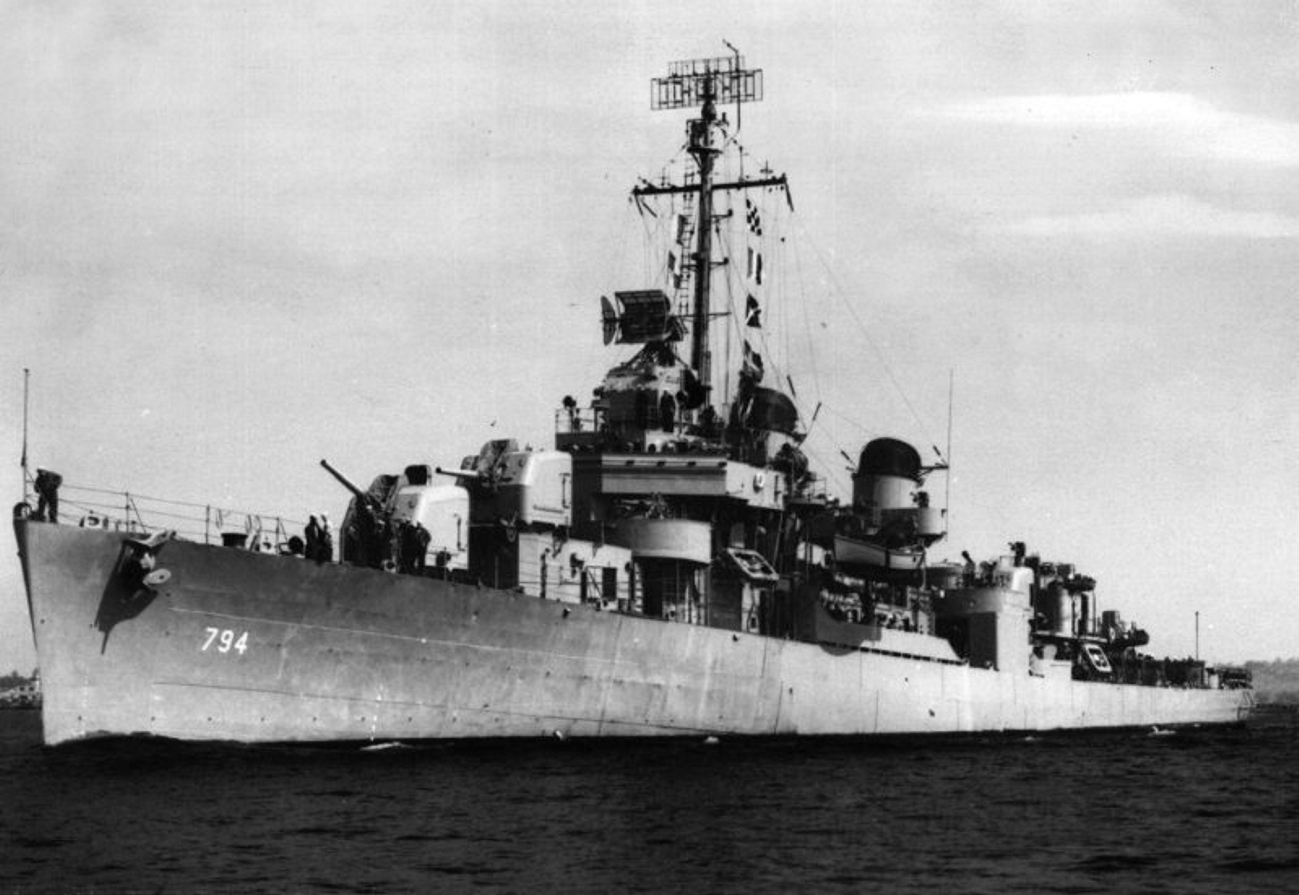
- USS Irwin (DD-794)

History

United States
- Namesake: Noble E. Irwin
- Builder: Bethlehem Shipbuilding, San Pedro, California
- Laid down: 2 May 1943
- Launched: 31 October 1943
- Commissioned: 14 February 1944
- Decommissioned: 10 January 1958
- Stricken: 15 March 1973
- Fate: Transferred to Brazil; 10 May 1968

History

Brazil
- Name: Santa Catarina (D32)
- Acquired: 10 May 1968
- Stricken: 28 December 1988
- Fate: Sunk in 1990

General characteristics
- Class & type: Fletcher-class destroyer
- Displacement: 2,050 tons
- Length: 376.5 ft (114.8 m)
- Beam: 39.7 ft (12.1 m)
- Draft: 17.9 ft (5.4 m)
- Propulsion: 60,000 shp (45 MW); 2 propellers
- Speed: 35 knots (65 km/h; 40 mph)
- Range: 6500 nmi. (12,000 km); @ 15 kt
- Complement: 320
- Armament: 5 × 5 in (130 mm), 10 × 40 mm AA guns, 7 × 20 mm AA guns, 10 × 21 inch (533 mm) torpedo tubes, 6 × depth charge posts, 2 × depth charge tracks

USS Irwin (DD-794), a Fletcher-class destroyer, was a ship of the United States Navy named for Rear Admiral Noble E. Irwin (1869–1937).

Irwin was launched 31 October 1943 by the Bethlehem Shipbuilding, San Pedro, California; sponsored by Mrs. Charles A. Lockwood, Jr., daughter of Admiral Irwin and wife of Vice Admiral Lockwood; and commissioned 14 February 1944.

== World War II ==
Following shakedown, Irwin departed San Diego 26 April 1944 for Hawaii, thence to Eniwetok to stage for the invasion of the Marianas. She sailed 11 June in the screen of escort carriers providing air cover for the invasion of Saipan 15 June 1944. As the Japanese Mobile Fleet was turned back in defeat from the Marianas in the Battle of the Philippine Sea 19 to 21 June, Irwin shot down an enemy torpedo bomber while repelling air attacks on the escort carriers.

Irwin bombarded the enemy on Saipan 21 to 29 June, guarded escort carriers covering the invasion of Tinian 23 July, then gave bombardment support to troops fighting on Guam. She next joined the screen of fast attack carriers hitting hard at enemy bases in the Palau Islands, along the coast of Luzon, Okinawa and Formosa. Off the latter enemy-held shore 14 October 1944, she shot down a torpedo bomber. She assisted in the escort of the bomb-damaged cruisers Houston (CL-81) and Canberra (CA-70) to safety, then again joined the screen of fast attack carriers giving direct air support to the liberation landings at Leyte, 20 October 1944.

The Japanese fleet made a three-pronged approach to the Philippines 24 October 1944 for the Battle of Leyte Gulf. Planes from Irwin's carrier task group made destructive bombing runs on the Japanese Center Force of battleships and cruisers. But land-based Japanese bombers retaliated with heavy air strikes, scoring a lucky bomb hit on light carrier Princeton (CVL-23). In a heroic saga that brought Irwin the award of the Navy Unit Commendation, she braved raging flames, violent explosions, falling debris, and exploding shells as she went alongside Princeton. Fighting dense black smoke in a choppy sea, she rigged hoses and fought fires in the forward part of the hangar deck. Later, when an explosion blew off the major portion of the carrier's stern, Irwin immediately dispatched boats and some of her men dove into choppy seas to rescue survivors. Two of the divers were Charles Edward Kahler and Bert Townsend Jr. who were designated strong swimmers aboard the Irwin. Though damaged herself, the destroyer stood at close quarters until she had rescued 646 men from the sea and from the decks of Princeton.

Irwin headed for Ulithi with Princeton survivors as the Japanese Southern Force was largely destroyed in the Battle of Surigao Strait, their carriers destroyed off Cape Engaño, and their powerful battleship-cruiser-destroyer bombardment force turned back in the Battle off Samar. From Ulithi she sailed for overhaul in the San Francisco Naval Shipyard (17 November 1944 – 23 January 1945). She then steamed for Hawaii, thence to the Marshalls and finally to Saipan, arriving 14 February 1945.

Irwin helped screen attack carriers giving direct air support to the invasion of Iwo Jima, 19–23 February 1945. She was then assigned to Task Force 54 (TF 54) for the invasion of Okinawa, participating in the preinvasion bombardment of 27–31 March. As the Japanese air arm had been decimated by this point in the war, the lack of trained and experienced pilots led them to deploy their most extensive kamikaze attacks during this battle; Irwin fought off repeated attacks from kamikaze, in addition to attack planes, torpedo boats and suicide boats. On 30 March Irwin repelled three Japanese torpedo boats, sinking one, damaging another, and forcing the other to flee. As Marines stormed the shores of Okinawa 1 April 1945, she shot down a twin-engined bomber and rescued one enemy survivor from this victim. For 2 months, Irwin bombarded enemy artillery positions, machine gun emplacements, troop concentrations, caves and suicide boat hiding places. She shot down a suicide torpedo bomber 12 April 1945, and scored another kill the 16th as she covered the landings on Ie Shima. Another enemy suicide plane was shot down 21 May. Irwin figured in another mercy mission the night of 16 June 1945 when she assisted in the rescue of survivors from destroyer Twiggs (DD-591), sunk by combined air, torpedo, and suicide attacks.

Irwin remained off Okinawa until hostilities ceased with Japan 15 August 1945. She entered Tokyo Bay 31 August and escorted occupation troops between Okinawa and Japan until 28 October when she stood out of Yokosuka for return to San Diego, arriving 15 November 1945. Following inactivation overhaul, she decommissioned there 31 May 1946 and joined the Pacific Reserve Fleet.

== 1951 – 1958 ==
Irwin recommissioned 26 February 1951 at Long Beach, California She sailed 12 May for overhaul in the Philadelphia Navy Yard, then shifted to base at Newport, R.I., 16 December 1952. She bolstered 6th Fleet strength and readiness in the Mediterranean, January to June 1952, trained along the eastern seaboard, then sailed from Fall River, Mass., 1 April 1953.

Steaming through the Panama Canal, Irwin called at San Diego and Hawaii en route to join the 7th Fleet in waters off embattled Korea. She guarded the fast attack carriers as they blasted communist targets far inland, and herself joined in the destruction of enemy coastal supply routes and depots by making repeated coastal gunstrikes in support of United Nations troops ashore. Following the uneasy truce, she transited the Suez Canal and called at Mediterranean ports en route to Boston, arriving 2 October 1953.

Irwin engaged in coastwise operations out of Newport until 5 January 1955 when she sailed for NATO maneuvers in the North Atlantic, thence into the Mediterranean. She returned to Newport 26 May 1955, engaging in Atlantic seaboard operations until departure 29 March 1956 to base at Long Beach, California

Irwin arrived in Long Beach 15 April but soon deployed to spend the summer with the roving 7th Fleet in waters ranging from Japan to Okinawa, the Philippines and Taiwan. She returned to Long Beach 11 August for tactics ranging as far west as Hawaii, again sailing 12 March 1957 to join the 7th Fleet in the Far East. Following patrol of the Taiwan straits, combined fleet maneuvers with SEATO nations, and goodwill visits to ports of the Philippines and Japan, she returned to Long Beach 24 August 1957 for inactivation. She decommissioned 10 January 1958.

Irwin received the Navy Unit Commendation and six battle stars for service in World War II and one battle star for Korean War service.

== Brazilian service ==
Irwin was transferred to Brazil 10 May 1968, where she was renamed Santa Catarina (D32).

Santa Catarina was stricken in 1988 and used thereafter as a practice target. In 1989 ex-D32 was used as target for the first launch of a live Sea Skua missile from a Brazilian Navy Westland Lynx helicopter. Ex-D32 was finally sunk in 1990.
