= Noble Edward Irwin =

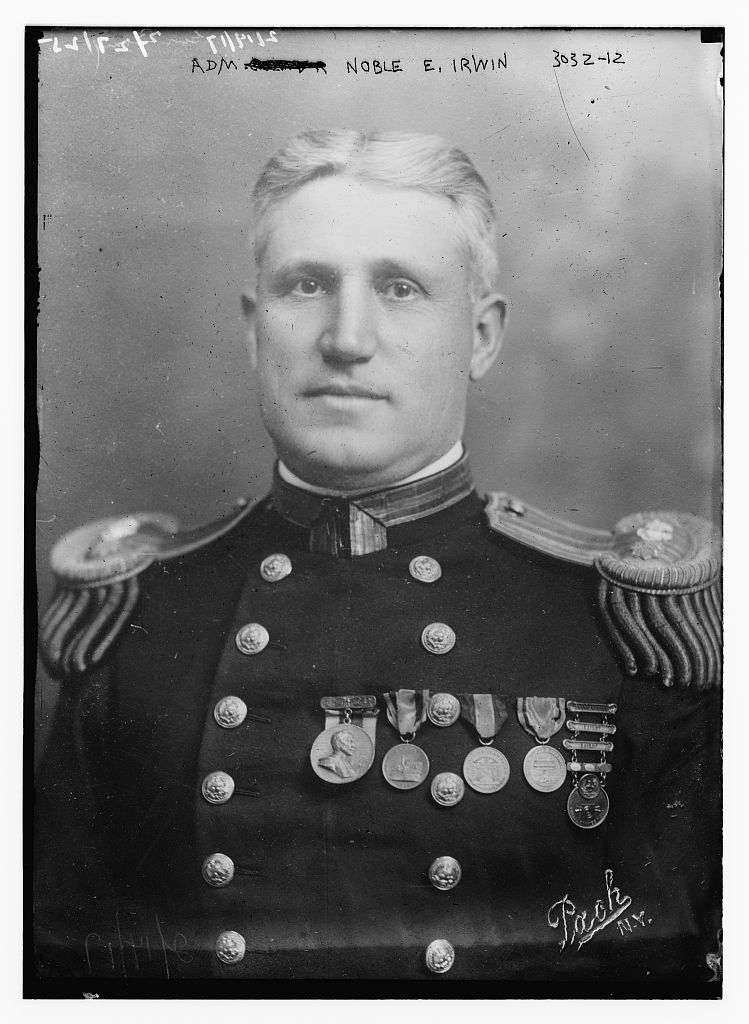

Noble Edward Irwin (September 29, 1869 – August 10, 1937) was a United States Navy Rear Admiral and Navy Cross recipient.

== Biography ==
He was born at Greenfield, Ohio on September 29, 1869. He graduated from the United States Naval Academy in June 1891, and was wounded in action 1 May 1898 while aboard the USS Baltimore in the Battle of Manila Bay. Irwin was also mentioned in the Executive Officer's official report for "intelligent personal work" on vessel repairs after the battle.

Noble Irwin commanded USS New Orleans in 1914 during the Fourth Battle of Topolobampo, a naval battle between Mexican forces during the Mexican Revolution.

Captain Irwin was awarded the Navy Cross for meritorious service as Director of Naval Aviation during World War I. Thereafter he was in command of battleship USS Oklahoma, and Destroyer Squadrons of the Scouting Fleet, and was Chief of the Naval Mission to Brazil (1927–1931).

Rear Admiral Irwin became Commandant of the 15th Naval District in March 1931 and was transferred to the Retired List 1 October 1933. He died at Warner Springs, California on August 10, 1937.

== Legacy ==
Rear Admiral Irwin was the father-in-law of Admiral Charles A. Lockwood. The US destroyer USS Irwin (DD-794) was named in his honor.
