= Topolobampo =

Port town in Sinaloa, Mexico

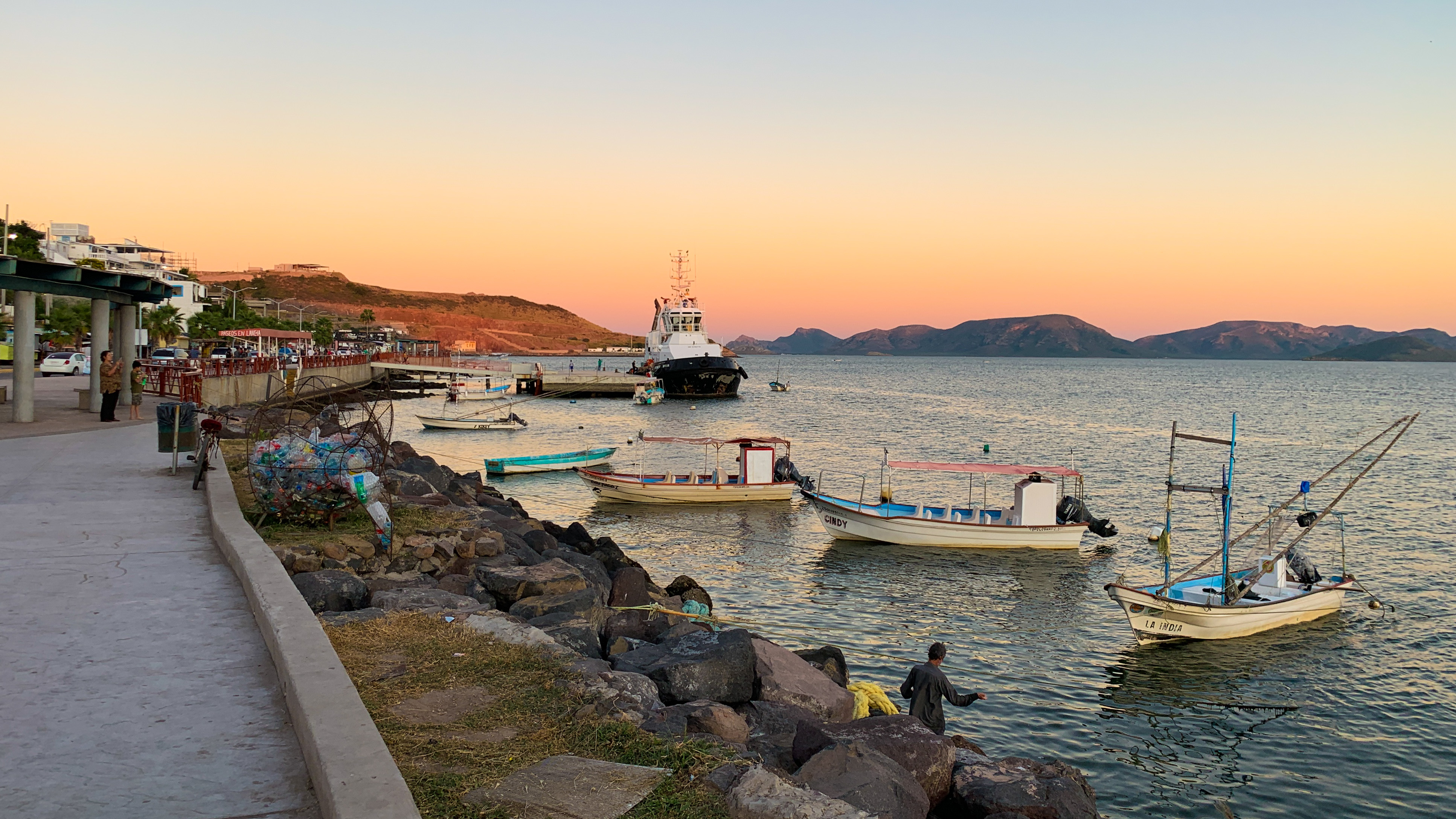

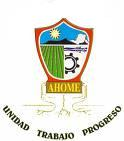
- Seal
- Nickname: Topo
- Location in Mexico Topolobampo (Mexico)
- Coordinates: 25°36′20″N 109°03′0″W
- Country: Mexico
- State: Sinaloa
- Municipality: Ahome
- Founded in: 1884
- Founded by: Albert K. Owen
- Elevation: 10 m (33 ft)

Population (2010)
  - Total: 6,361
- Time zone: UTC-7 (Mountain Time Zone)
- Postal code: 81370
- Website: Official page

Topolobampo (Spanish pronunciation: [topoloˈβampo]) is a port town on the Gulf of California, located in the municipality of Ahome in northwest Sinaloa, Mexico. It is the fifth-largest town in Ahome, reporting a 2020 census population of 6,198.

The port connects the region to the rest of northern Mexico via the Ferrocarril Chihuahua al Pacífico (English: Chihuahua–Pacific Railway), which has a terminus in the nearby city of Los Mochis. Topolobampo also houses a terminal for ferry lines connecting the port to La Paz, Baja California Sur.

The town is the beginning of the Mexico–U.S. trade corridor La Entrada al Pacífico, which connects the port to Midland–Odessa, Texas.

== Topolobampo utopian colony ==
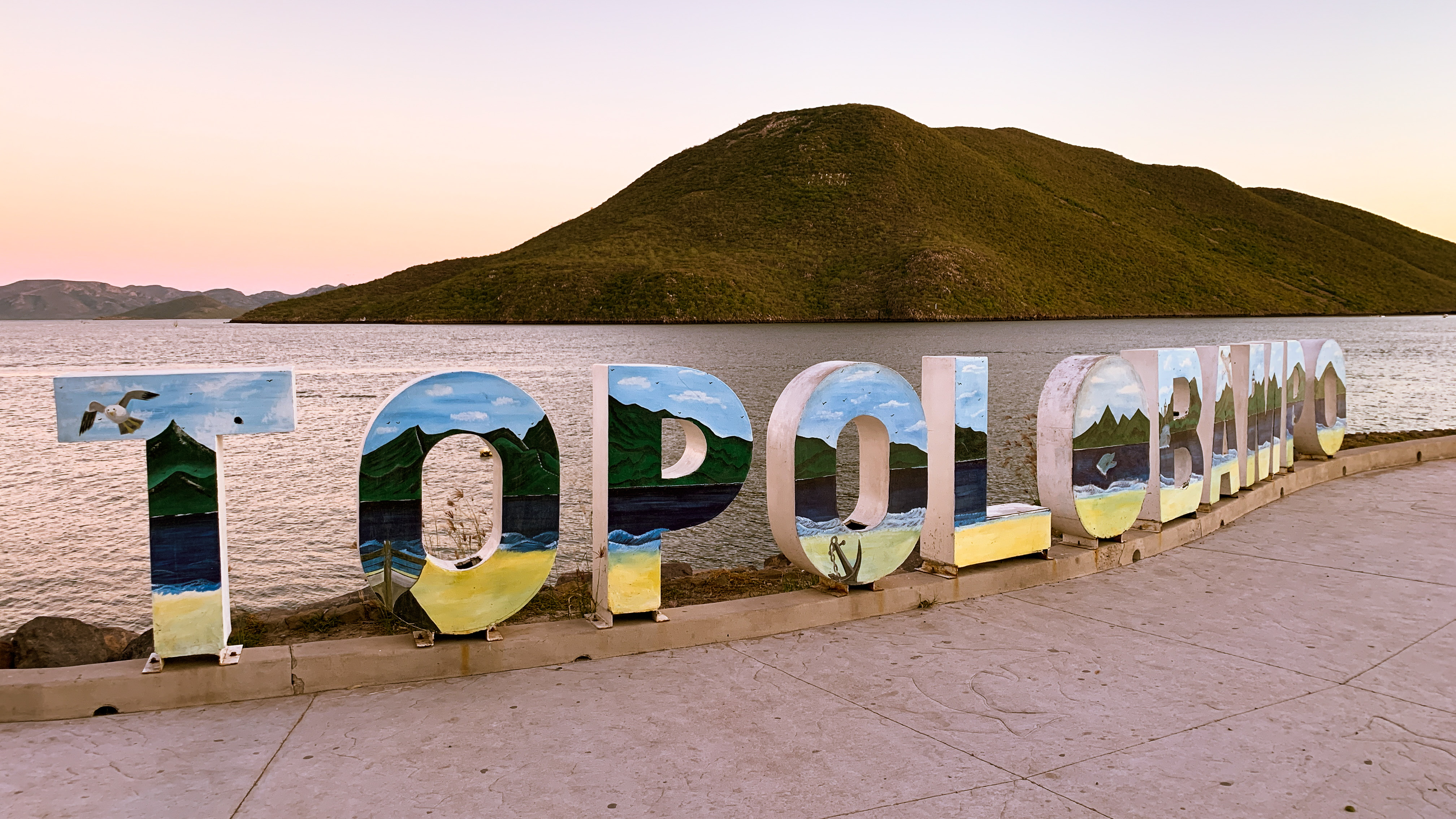
Sign in Topolobampo, Sinaloa

Topolobampo was the site of a radical "utopian" colony inspired by Henry George's economic ideas. Albert Kimsey Owen was its founder and leader; Marie Howland and John W. Lovell were prominent backers.

That utopian group published a newsletter in English, The Credit Foncier of Sinaloa in Topolobampo. The masthead says "Collective ownership and management for public utilities and conveniences - the community responsible for the health, usefulness, individuality and security of each. - Albert K. Owen." Two pages of one edition (vol. 4, no. 24, September 1, 1889, whole no. 161), has been preserved at Western Reserve Historical Society in Cleveland, Ohio, pasted into a Wallace Cathcart scrapbook on Shakers. Those two pages include an article on the Tyringham, Massachusetts Shakers and correspondence from several prospective members. Evidently the fledgling group hoped to use the reminiscences of Julia Johnson, a former Shaker, to market the concept of a communal society to prospective members.

The colony quickly found difficulties. Every enterprise failed, and soon the colonists found themselves without food or clean water. Things became so bad that in 1888 the U.S. Navy was compelled to send USS Iroquois to evacuate the survivors. None accepted the offer. Only in 1962 was the railroad connecting the colony with the U.S. completed. In 1967, The San Diego Union reported 500 families forming the core of the modern city of Topolobampo.

== Geography ==
=== Climate ===
Topolobampo has a tropical arid desert climate.

Climate data for Topolobampo (1951–2010)
Month	Jan	Feb	Mar	Apr	May	Jun	Jul	Aug	Sep	Oct	Nov	Dec	Year
Record high °C (°F)	39.0 (102.2)	39.0 (102.2)	38.0 (100.4)	38.0 (100.4)	39.0 (102.2)	40.0 (104.0)	41.0 (105.8)	43.5 (110.3)	41.0 (105.8)	43.0 (109.4)	38.5 (101.3)	37.0 (98.6)	43.5 (110.3)
Mean daily maximum °C (°F)	24.8 (76.6)	25.8 (78.4)	27.5 (81.5)	29.6 (85.3)	32.0 (89.6)	34.1 (93.4)	35.0 (95.0)	34.8 (94.6)	34.2 (93.6)	32.9 (91.2)	29.3 (84.7)	25.6 (78.1)	30.5 (86.9)
Daily mean °C (°F)	19.2 (66.6)	20.1 (68.2)	21.7 (71.1)	23.9 (75.0)	26.5 (79.7)	29.5 (85.1)	30.6 (87.1)	30.4 (86.7)	29.9 (85.8)	28.1 (82.6)	24.0 (75.2)	20.4 (68.7)	25.4 (77.7)
Mean daily minimum °C (°F)	13.7 (56.7)	14.4 (57.9)	16.0 (60.8)	18.2 (64.8)	21.0 (69.8)	24.9 (76.8)	26.2 (79.2)	25.9 (78.6)	25.6 (78.1)	23.3 (73.9)	18.7 (65.7)	15.2 (59.4)	20.3 (68.5)
Record low °C (°F)	5.0 (41.0)	8.0 (46.4)	9.0 (48.2)	11.0 (51.8)	12.0 (53.6)	17.0 (62.6)	20.0 (68.0)	18.0 (64.4)	15.0 (59.0)	14.0 (57.2)	11.0 (51.8)	5.5 (41.9)	5.0 (41.0)
Average precipitation mm (inches)	12.1 (0.48)	3.8 (0.15)	0.6 (0.02)	0.0 (0.0)	0.8 (0.03)	1.9 (0.07)	57.7 (2.27)	96.1 (3.78)	66.6 (2.62)	31.9 (1.26)	19.0 (0.75)	22.1 (0.87)	312.6 (12.31)
Average precipitation days (≥ 0.1 mm)	1.3	0.7	0.2	0.0	0.1	0.2	3.8	5.4	3.9	1.9	1.1	1.4	20.0
Source: Servicio Meteorologico Nacional

The sea experiences lows of 19 - 20 °C during the winter months, and highs of 29 - 31 °C during the summer months.

Average Sea Temperature
Jan	Feb	Mar	Apr	May	Jun	Jul	Aug	Sep	Oct	Nov	Dec
20 °C 68 °F	19 °C 66 °F	20 °C 68 °F	22 °C 72 °F	25 °C 77 °F	27 °C 81 °F	29 °C 85 °F	31 °C 88 °F	31 °C 88 °F	29 °C 84 °F	25 °C 77 °F	21 °C 70 °F

== See also ==
- Naval battles of the Mexican Revolution
