= Hurricane Flossie (1995) =

Category 1 Pacific hurricane in 1995

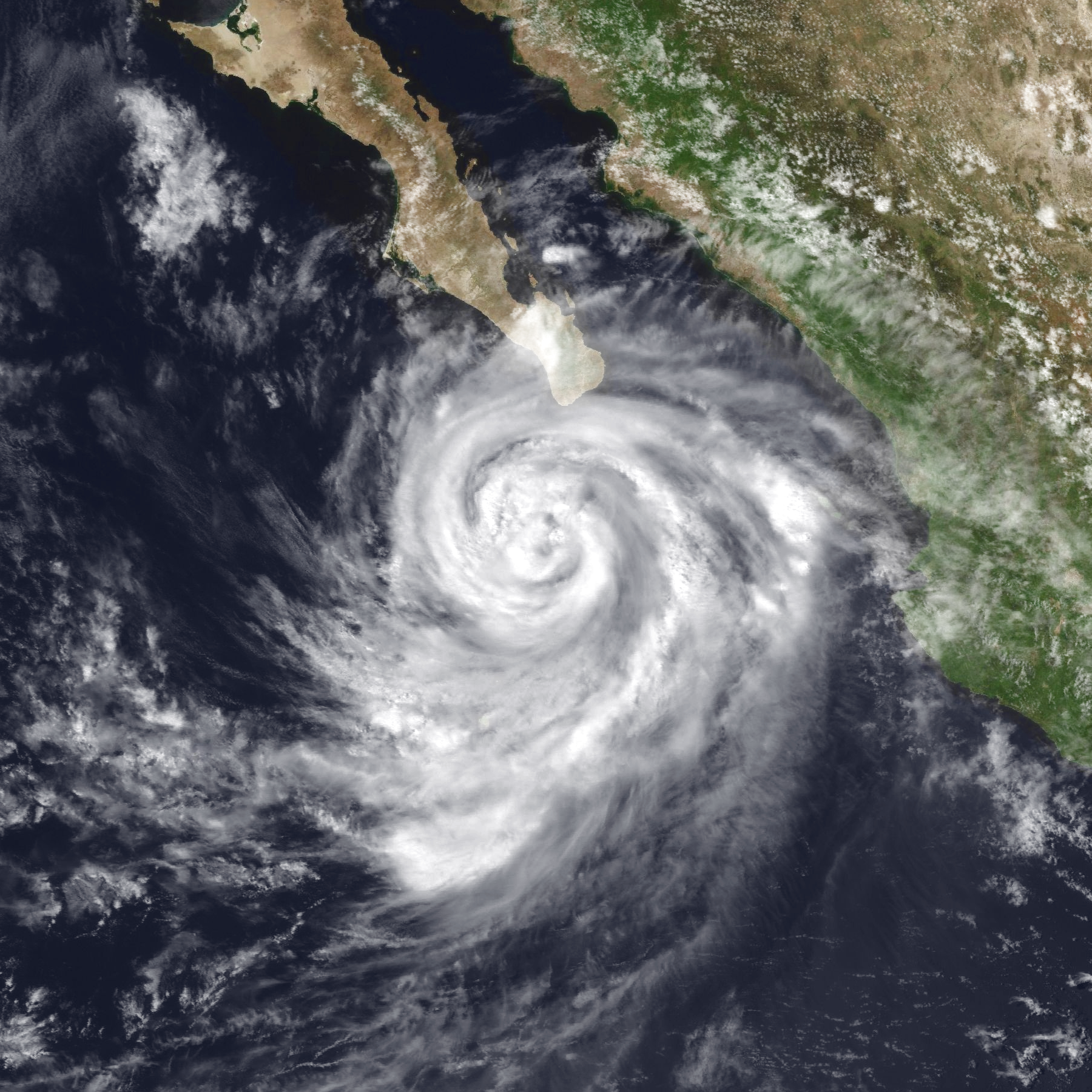
- Hurricane Flossie south of the Baja California peninsula

Meteorological history
- Formed: August 7, 1995
- Dissipated: August 14, 1995

Category 1 hurricane
- 1-minute sustained (SSHWS/NWS)
- Highest winds: 80 mph (130 km/h)
- Lowest pressure: 978 mbar (hPa); 28.88 inHg

Overall effects
- Fatalities: 8
- Damage: $5 million (1995 USD)
- Areas affected: Mexico, Arizona
- IBTrACS
- Part of the 1995 Pacific hurricane season

Hurricane Flossie was a tropical cyclone which impacted Mexico and Arizona in August 1995. The seventh tropical cyclone, sixth named storm and fourth hurricane of the 1995 Pacific hurricane season, Flossie formed out of a large circulation as a tropical depression on August 7. The tropical depression slowly moved westward, and strengthened into a tropical storm late on August 8, though it was not designated as Tropical Storm Flossie until August 9. Flossie turned more northwest and gradually strengthened, eventually reaching hurricane strength on August 10, and reached peak intensity 12 hours later. After this, Flossie turned westward and started to weaken, being downgraded to a tropical storm on August 12 and a tropical depression on August 13, before finally dissipating on August 14.

Flossie caused heavy impacts in Mexico and Arizona, with rain totals nearly reaching 10 inches (250 mm) in parts of the Baja California Peninsula and 4 inches (100 mm) in Arizona. In Mexico, two people drowned in Cabo San Lucas, and another five died in the cities of Puerto Vallarta and Mazatlán. In Arizona, one person died while attempting to drive through a flash flood, while at least eleven more were injured. Water, electricity and telephone services were cut off to many Arizonan customers. Damage in Arizona totaled to at least $5 million (1995 USD).

== Meteorological history ==
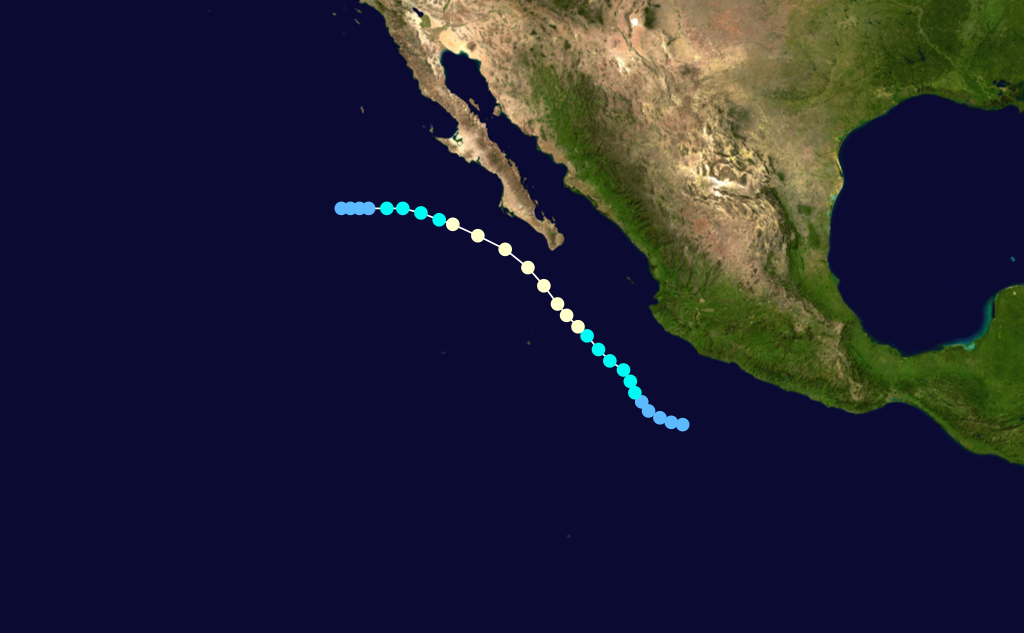
Map plotting the storm's track and intensity, according to the Saffir–Simpson scale Map key Saffir–Simpson scale Tropical depression (≤38 mph, ≤62 km/h) Tropical storm (39–73 mph, 63–118 km/h) Category 1 (74–95 mph, 119–153 km/h) Category 2 (96–110 mph, 154–177 km/h) Category 3 (111–129 mph, 178–208 km/h) Category 4 (130–156 mph, 209–251 km/h) Category 5 (≥157 mph, ≥252 km/h) Unknown Storm type Tropical cyclone Subtropical cyclone Extratropical cyclone, remnant low, tropical disturbance, or monsoon depression

A large cyclonic circulation was located within the eastern Pacific Ocean throughout early August. Containing a low pressure area, it eventually became a tropical depression with 35 mph (55 km/h) winds at approximately 12:00 UTC on August 7, while roughly 300 miles west–southwest of Acapulco. It proceeded to move west–northwest over the next day, and at 18:00 UTC on August 8, the depression strengthened further to a tropical storm. Operationally, the storm was not identified until 03:00 UTC on August 9, upon which it was designated Tropical Depression Seven-E. The next advisory, six hours later, designated it as Tropical Storm Flossie. Turning more northwest, the storm moved parallel to the Mexican coast while gradually strengthening.

Wind shear around the storm decreased, aiding development, and by 06:00 UTC on August 10, Flossie strengthened into a hurricane. Six hours later, Flossie reached peak winds of 80 mph (130 km/h), and another six hours later, deepened to its lowest pressure at 978 millibars (28.88 inHg). Around this time, Flossie made its closest approach to land, being located around 75 miles (121 km) southwest of the Baja California Peninsula. Operationally, Flossie was assessed as having maintained peak winds of 75 mph (121 km/h) and a lowest pressure of 987 mb (29.1 inHg) from when it was operationally designated as a hurricane, at 18:00 UTC on August 10, to 09:00 UTC on August 12. Flossie proceeded to move over cooler waters, weakening and turning further westward. At 06:00 UTC on August 12, the storm weakened below hurricane strength, and weakened to below tropical storm strength 24 hours later. Flossie ultimately dissipated on August 14; advisories had been stopped three hours earlier. Throughout most of the storm's life, it moved at a speed somewhere between 6 and 12 mph (9.7 and 19.3 km/h). Flossie also negatively impacted Tropical Storm Gabrielle's development in the Atlantic.

== Preparations and impact ==
=== Mexico ===
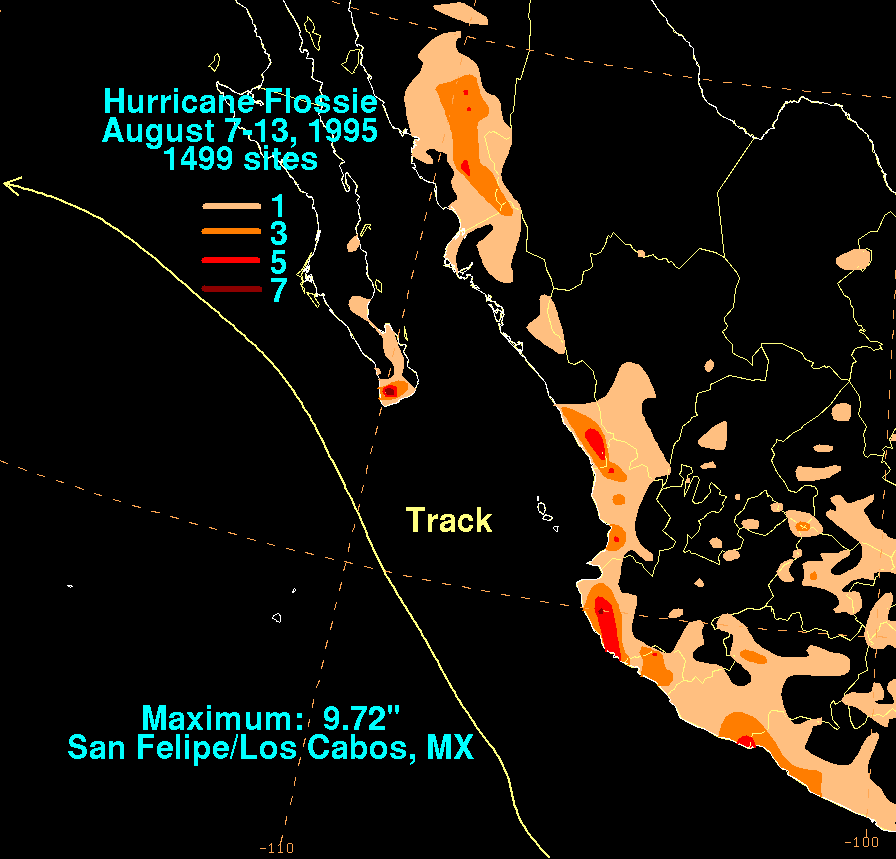
A map of Flossie's rainfall in Mexico

Mexico issued a tropical storm warning at 15:00 UTC on August 9 from Punta Tejupan to Cabo Corrientes; this warning was discontinued six hours later. A tropical storm watch was issued for the portions of Baja California Sur south of La Paz at 21:00 UTC on August 9; at 15:00 UTC on August 10, the watch was upgraded to a warning. The warning was extended from San Juanico to Loreto on August 11 at 10:00 UTC. All warnings for Baja California Sur were discontinued at 00:00 UTC on August 12. Ports in Cabo San Lucas and Mazatlán were closed on August 10 in preparation for the storm.

Flossie killed five people in the cities of Puerto Vallarta and Mazatlán. Another two deaths occurred in Cabo San Lucas, where a man and his son drowned. Three fishermen went missing from Punta Perula (south of Puerto Vallarta) on August 8. Swells over 10 feet (3.0 m) struck Cabo San Lucas, which also recorded a 55 mph (89 km/h) wind gust; not far away, San José del Cabo recorded a 63 mph (101 km/h) gust. Approximately 1,000 people were evacuated in the area. A cruise ship along the Mexican coast was forced to return to port. The Palmilla Fleet lost five of her six ships in the Palmilla Bay, north of Cabo San Lucas. The highest rain totals were 9.72 inches (247 mm) in San Felipe and Los Cabos.

=== United States ===
An image showcasing injuries and property damage from Flossie in Arizona

Flossie brought hurricane-force wind gusts, 0.75-inch (1.9 cm) hail, and up to 4 inches (100 mm) of rain to Arizona. Flash flood warnings were issued for Santa Cruz, Graham and Pinal counties on the night of August 10; all were canceled an hour after issuing. Another set of warnings were issued throughout the night of August 11 and the morning of August 12; two were issued for Graham County, covering two and a half hours, while another two were issued in Gila County, covering four hours. A woman drowned in Tucson after attempting to drive through a flash flood and being swept into a canyon; two people attempted to save her, but were unable to. Another eleven motorists in the area were stranded; one motorist also floated down the same arroyo as the woman who died, but was able to escape. A total of eight people were injured in a five-car pileup on Interstate 19; fallen power poles blocked some portions of the highway, and a 6-mile (9.7 km) stretch had to be closed for several hours. Another three people were injured after their mobile homes were turned over as a result of gusty winds.

Flossie damaged a warehouse belonging to the Muscular Dystrophy Association, containing 10,000 videotapes of annual association Jerry Lewis telethons. At least 35,000 electricity customers lost power at the height of the storm; 1,000 of them were still without power the next day. A reservoir providing water to 50,000 people in Tucson was contaminated by the storm and had to be closed; it resumed service 17 days later. The entire town of Green Valley lost power due to the storm. US West landline service was knocked out for "hundreds of residents and businesses" around Tucson; two weeks later, many customers were still without landline service. Multiple roofs were blown off of houses. An American Red Cross shelter was put up in Tucson on August 11; it expected to receive around 200 people, but did not receive anyone. Property damage in Arizona totaled to at least $5 million (1995 USD), of which over $2 million came around Tucson. Moisture from Flossie caused a flash flood warning to be issued in Cibola County, New Mexico.

== See also ==
- Hurricane Henriette (1995) – Made landfall in the Baja California Peninsula later in 1995
- Hurricane Ismael – Caused significant damage and over 100 deaths in Mexico a month after Flossie
- Hurricane Nora (1997) – Struck the Baja California Peninsula and Arizona 2 years later
- List of Arizona hurricanes
- List of Baja California Peninsula hurricanes
