= 1995 hurricane season =

1995 hurricane season may refer to:

- The 1995 Atlantic hurricane season
- The 1995 Pacific hurricane season
