= Hurricane Ismael =

Category 1 Pacific hurricane in 1995

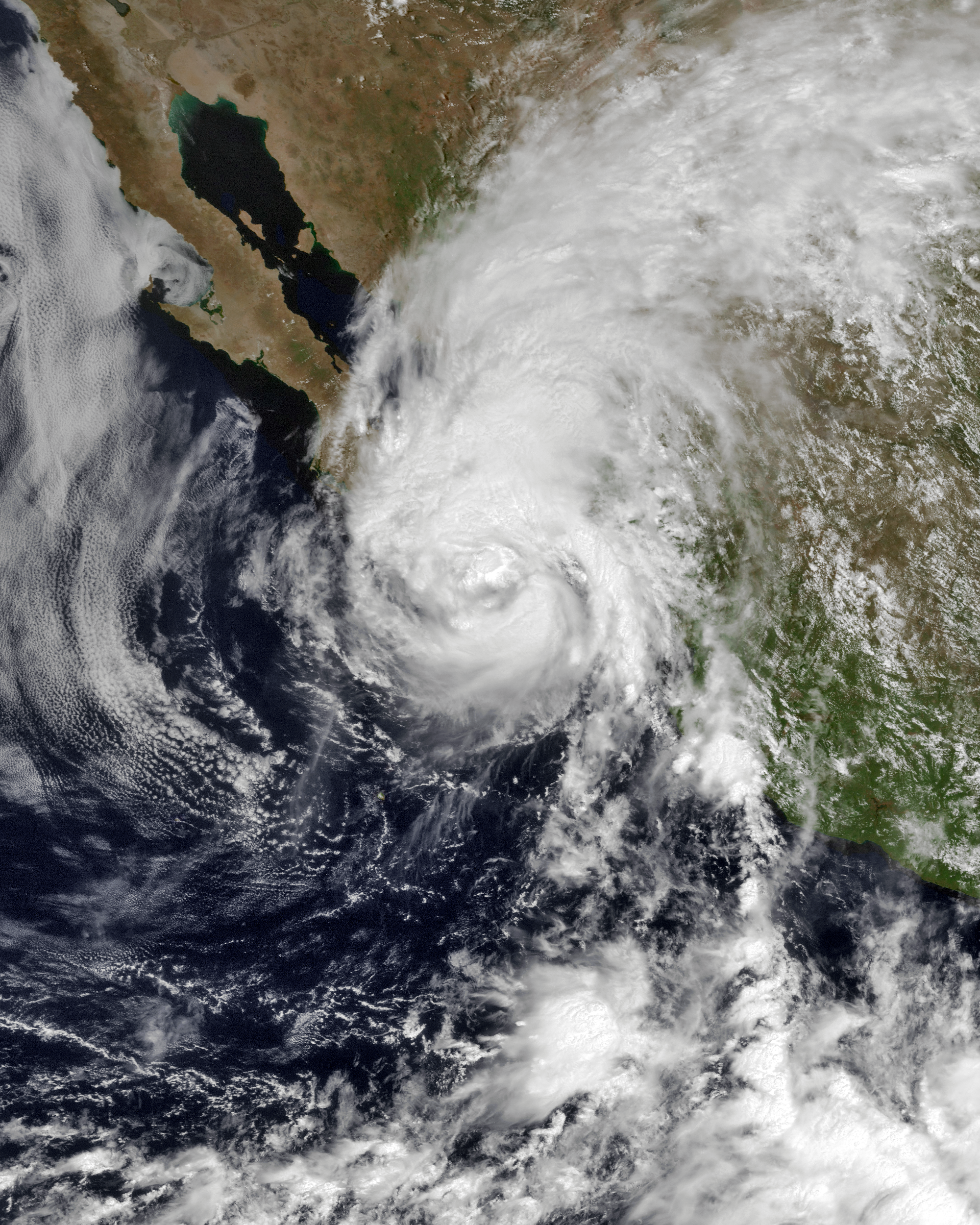
- Hurricane Ismael approaching Sinaloa on September 14

Meteorological history
- Formed: September 12, 1995
- Dissipated: September 16, 1995

Category 1 hurricane
- 1-minute sustained (SSHWS/NWS)
- Highest winds: 80 mph (130 km/h)
- Lowest pressure: 983 mbar (hPa); 29.03 inHg

Overall effects
- Fatalities: 116 total
- Damage: $26 million (1995 USD)
- Areas affected: Mexico; Southwestern United States
- IBTrACS
- Part of the 1995 Pacific hurricane season

Hurricane Ismael killed 116 people in Mexico during the 1995 Pacific hurricane season. It developed from a persistent area of deep convection on September 12, and steadily strengthened as it moved to the north-northwest. Ismael attained hurricane status on September 14 while located 210 miles (340 km) off the coast of Mexico. It continued to the north, and after passing a short distance east of Baja California Sur it made landfall on Topolobampo in the state of Sinaloa with winds of 80 mph (130 km/h). Ismael rapidly weakened over land, and dissipated on September 16 over northwestern Mexico. The remnants entered the United States and extended eastward into the Mid-Atlantic states.

Offshore, Ismael produced waves of up to 30 feet (9.1 m) in height. Hundreds of fishermen were unprepared for the hurricane, which was expected to move more slowly, and as a result 52 ships were wrecked, killing 57 fishermen. On land, Ismael caused 59 deaths in mainland Mexico and resulted in $26 million in damage (1995 USD, 54.9 million 2026 USD). The hurricane destroyed thousands of houses, leaving 30,000 people homeless. Moisture from the storm extended into the United States, causing heavy rainfall and localized moderate damage in southeastern New Mexico.

== Meteorological history ==
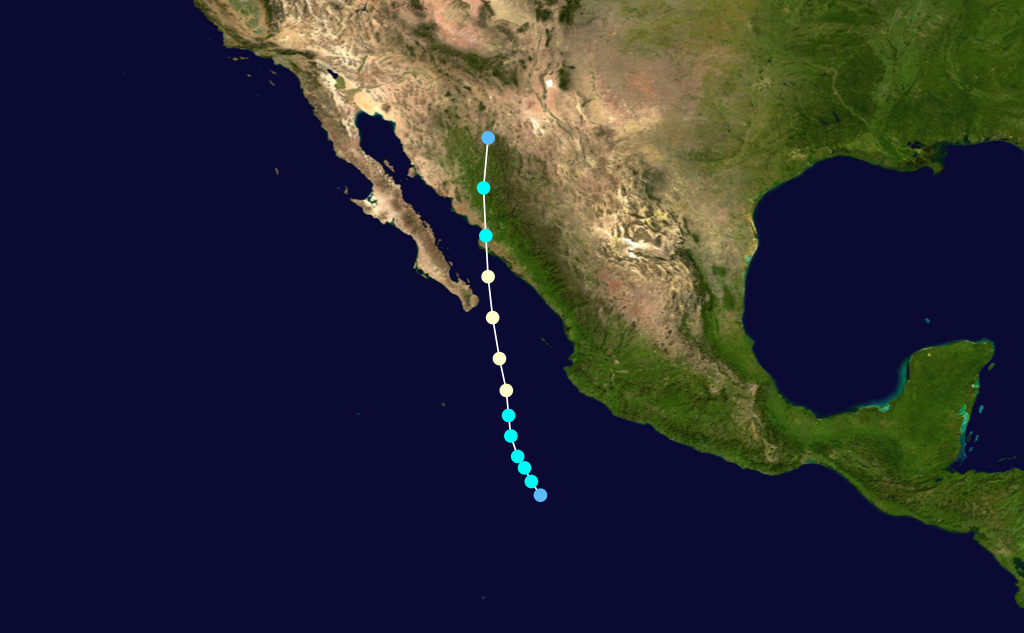
Map plotting the storm's track and intensity, according to the Saffir–Simpson scale Map key Saffir–Simpson scale Tropical depression (≤38 mph, ≤62 km/h) Tropical storm (39–73 mph, 63–118 km/h) Category 1 (74–95 mph, 119–153 km/h) Category 2 (96–110 mph, 154–177 km/h) Category 3 (111–129 mph, 178–208 km/h) Category 4 (130–156 mph, 209–251 km/h) Category 5 (≥157 mph, ≥252 km/h) Unknown Storm type Tropical cyclone Subtropical cyclone Extratropical cyclone, remnant low, tropical disturbance, or monsoon depression

A poorly organized area of convection persisted about 170 miles (270 km) off the southern coast of Guatemala on September 9. It moved west-northwestward, and after three days without further organization a circulation developed off the southwest coast of Mexico. The system quickly organized, resulting in Dvorak classifications beginning later that day. Convective banding became better organized, and late on September 12 it developed into Tropical Depression Ten-E while located about 350 miles (560 km) south-southwest of Manzanillo, Colima. The depression moved to the northwest, and following an increase in deep convection it intensified into Tropical Storm Ismael early on September 13. Upon attaining tropical storm status, Ismael was located in an area of warm water temperatures with well-established upper-level outflow. Initially the storm moved to the northwest, though in response to the interaction with an upper-level low over Baja California Ismael gradually turned to the north. Such a change in motion was not operationally predicted by forecasters, though they noted uncertainty in Ismael's track due to the low. Ismael steadily strengthened as it moved northward, though it failed to organize significantly; early on September 14 the center remained poorly defined despite winds of 70 mph (110 km/h). However, the outflow remained well-organized as it remained over warm waters. Ismael became better organized, and later on September 14 it intensified into a hurricane while located 210 miles (340 km) west-southwest of Puerto Vallarta.

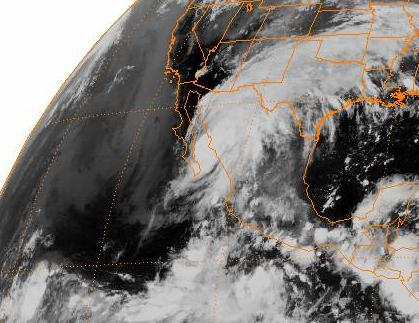
Hurricane Ismael making landfall

Ismael quickly developed a poorly defined eye, and six hours after becoming a hurricane it reached a peak intensity of 80 mph (130 km/h). Steered between a mid- to upper-level trough to its west and a ridge to its east, Ismael accelerated as it moved just west of due north. Late on September 14 Ismael passed 65 miles (105 km) east of Cabo San Lucas. The hurricane maintained its strength as it continued northward, and made landfall on Topolobampo in the state of Sinaloa on September 15. Ismael rapidly weakened as the circulation crossed the high terrain of the Sierra Madre Occidental, and it dissipated early on September 16 about 55 miles (89 km) south of the Mexico/United States border. The remnants of Ismael continued northward, and moisture from the storm extended over the southwestern United States eastward through the Mid-Atlantic States.

== Preparations ==
Initially, Hurricane Ismael was predicted to remain over the open waters of the Pacific Ocean. However, when a northward motion became apparent, the government of Mexico issued a tropical storm warning from Manzanillo, Colima, to Cabo Corrientes, Jalisco and for the Islas Marias. Shortly thereafter, the warning was extended to Los Mochis and issued for the eastern coast of Baja California Sur south of 25° N. Ten hours before Ismael made its final landfall, the Mexican government issued a hurricane warning from Mazatlán to Los Mochis. Prior to the arrival of the hurricane, 1,572 people evacuated to five emergency shelters.

== Impact ==
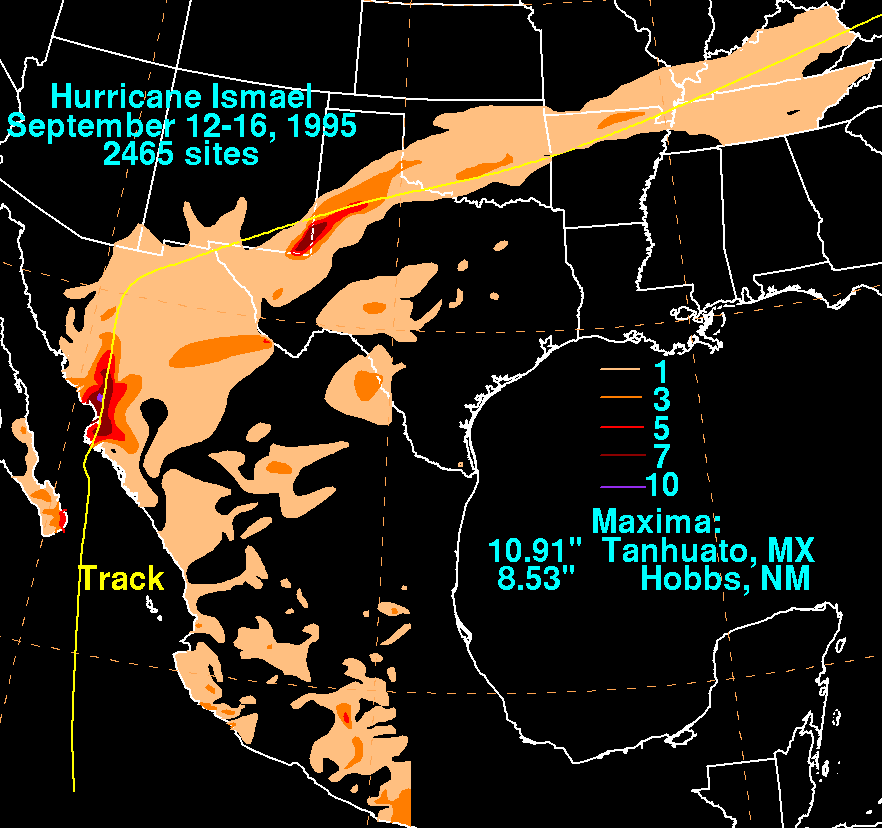
Rainfall from Ismael

Hurricane Ismael produced 30 feet (9.1 m) waves over the Gulf of California and coastal waters off of Mexico. The hurricane, which was forecast to move more slowly, left hundreds of fishermen unprepared due to deficient communications between the boats and harbor authorities. As a result, 52 boats were wrecked, of which 20 sank. 57 fishermen died offshore, with dozens washing ashore as the high tides receded. About 150 fishermen survived the storm by waiting on islands, sandbars, or disabled fishing boats. Navy rescue teams and other fishermen searched for days off the Mexican coast to find victims and survivors from the storm.

While moving through northwestern Mexico, Hurricane Ismael dropped moderate to heavy rainfall including a state record of 7.76 inches (197 mm) in Sinaloa, resulting in the flooding of four municipalities. In one municipality, the passage of the hurricane destroyed 373 cardboard houses and damaged 4,790 others. The passage of the hurricane left 177 houses without drinking water and left four municipalities without power. Damage was heaviest where the hurricane made landfall. In Los Mochis, the winds from Ismael knocked down houses and telephone poles, though no deaths were reported. 59 people were killed in Sinaloa.

Ismael produced heavy rainfall further to the north, peaking at 10.9 inches (280 mm) in Sonora. Severe flooding was reported in Huatabampo. The hurricane directly affected 24,111 people in 8 municipalities. Throughout Sonora, the strong winds destroyed 4,728 houses and removed the roofs of 6,827 homes. The hurricane also destroyed 107 schools and 2 health centers in the state. The passage of Hurricane Ismael damaged high-tension power lines and cable lines, causing interruptions to the communication system. The hurricane also weakened 2,163 miles (3,481 km) of gravel roads and damaged about 100 miles (160 km) of paved highways. 250 people lost their jobs in Sonora due to sunken or damaged fishing boats. In addition, about 83 square miles (210 km^{2}) of crop lands were impacted. Damage in Sonora amounted to $8.6 million (1995 USD, $50 million 1995 MXN, $106 million 2026 USD).

Throughout Mexico the hurricane left 30,000 people homeless. Including offshore casualties, Ismael caused at least 116 deaths and damage totaling to $26 million (1995 USD, $197 million 1995 MXN, $54.9 million 2026 USD). The Mexican government allocated about $4.5 million (1995 USD, 34 million 1995 MXN, $9.51 million 2026 USD) in funds for the restoration of houses and the overall infrastructure. Officials distributed 4,800 sheets, 500 cushions, and 1,500 blankets to hurricane victims.

Moisture from the remnants of Ismael extended into southwestern Arizona and southern New Mexico. The storm dropped heavy precipitation near the New Mexico/Texas border, including a peak total of 8.53 inches (217 mm) in Hobbs, New Mexico. In addition, there were unofficial estimates of over 10 inches (250 mm). The rainfall led to flooding of roads and buildings. Multiple highways and railroads were closed due to washouts. Damaged totaled to $250,000 (1995 USD) in New Mexico. In Lubbock, Texas, the rainfall led to flash flooding, closing many intersections and roads. The remnants of Ismael produced over 3 inches (76 mm) of rain in southwestern Oklahoma and northern Arkansas, with moisture extending eastward into the Mid-Atlantic States. There, the rainfall helped to relieve drought conditions.

== Retirement ==
Due to the damage and deaths, the World Meteorological Organization (WMO) retired the name Ismael and replaced it with Israel, another Spanish name beginning with the letter "I" for use in the 2001 season. However, after leaders of the Anti-Defamation League and the Zionist Organization of America made public remarks in the spring of 2001 sharply criticizing usage of the name, hundreds of people sent e-mails or called the National Hurricane Center (NHC) to express their opposition to its use. In response, NHC director Max Mayfield urged the WMO to choose a different name. The name Israel was replaced with Ivo during the season.

== See also ==
- List of Pacific hurricanes
- List of retired Pacific hurricane names
