= 1995 Pacific hurricane season =

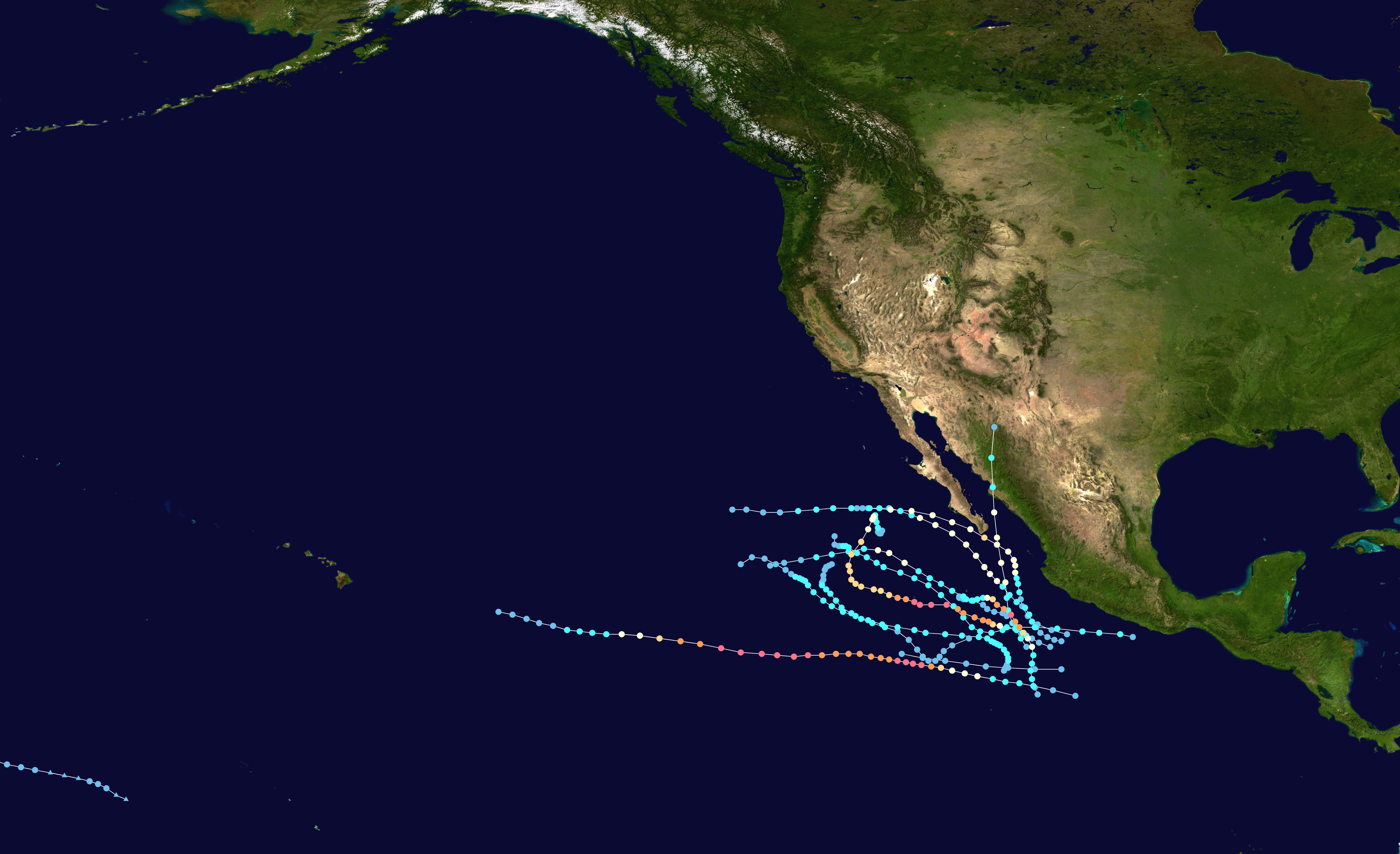
- Season summary map

Seasonal boundaries
- First system formed: May 21, 1995
- Last system dissipated: September 26, 1995

Strongest storm
- Name: Juliette
  - Maximum winds: 150 mph (240 km/h) (1-minute sustained)
  - Lowest pressure: 930 mbar (hPa; 27.46 inHg)

Seasonal statistics
- Total depressions: 11
- Total storms: 10
- Hurricanes: 7
- Major hurricanes (Cat. 3+): 3
- Total fatalities: 124 total
- Total damage: $31 million (1995 USD)

Related articles
- Timeline of the 1995 Pacific hurricane season; 1995 Atlantic hurricane season; 1995 Pacific typhoon season; 1995 North Indian Ocean cyclone season

The 1995 Pacific hurricane season had below average activity, the first season to do since 1979, and was the start of a prolonged period of generally below average activity within the Eastern Pacific. The season saw eleven tropical cyclones form, of which ten became named tropical storms. Seven of these storms attained hurricane status, and three of them becoming major hurricanes. There were fewer tropical storms than the average of 16, while the number of hurricanes and major hurricanes were slightly below average. The season officially started on May 15, 1995, in the Eastern Pacific, and on June 1, 1995, in the Central Pacific, and lasted until November 30, 1995. These dates conventionally delimit the period of each year when most tropical cyclones form in the northeastern Pacific Ocean.

Of the eleven tropical cyclones that formed during the season, four affected land, with the most notable storm of the season being Hurricane Ismael, which killed at least 116 people in Mexico. The strongest hurricane in the season was Hurricane Juliette, which reached peak winds of 150 mph (240 km/h), but did not significantly affect land. Hurricane Adolph was an early-season Category 4 hurricane. Hurricane Henriette brushed the Baja California Peninsula in early September.

== Season summary ==
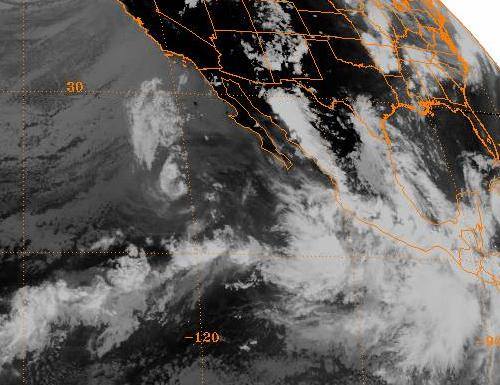
Tropical Depression Erick (left) and Tropical Storm Flossie (bottom-center) on August 7

The seasonal activity during 1995 was below normal, and marked the first of several seasons with lower than normal activity. Four tropical cyclones affected Mexico: first, Hurricane Flossie passed within 75 miles (121 km) of Baja California Peninsula, producing moderate winds and killing seven people. Afterwards, Tropical Storm Gil dropped heavy rainfall in Southern Mexico early in its life, though caused no damage. Hurricane Henriette later made landfall near Cabo San Lucas with winds of 100 mph (160 km/h), resulting in moderate damage but no deaths. Finally, Ismael struck the state of Sinaloa as a minimal hurricane. Offshore, fishermen were caught off guard by the hurricane, causing 57 of them to drown. On land, Ismael destroyed thousands of houses, leaving 30,000 homeless and killing another 59. Both Hurricanes Flossie and Ismael also produced moisture and localized damage in the Southwestern United States.

Activity in the Central Pacific Ocean was below normal, as well. No tropical storms formed in the basin. For the first time in four years, Barbara was the only tropical cyclone to exist within the basin, but it formed in the Eastern Pacific. It entered as a weakening tropical storm, and quickly dissipated, without affecting land. It was the least active in the basin since 1979, when the basin was completely quiet, as no storms entered the basin that year. The accumulated cyclone energy (ACE) index for the 1995 Pacific hurricane season in total was 100.2 units.

== Systems ==
=== Tropical Depression One-E ===
- Tropical depression (SSHWS)
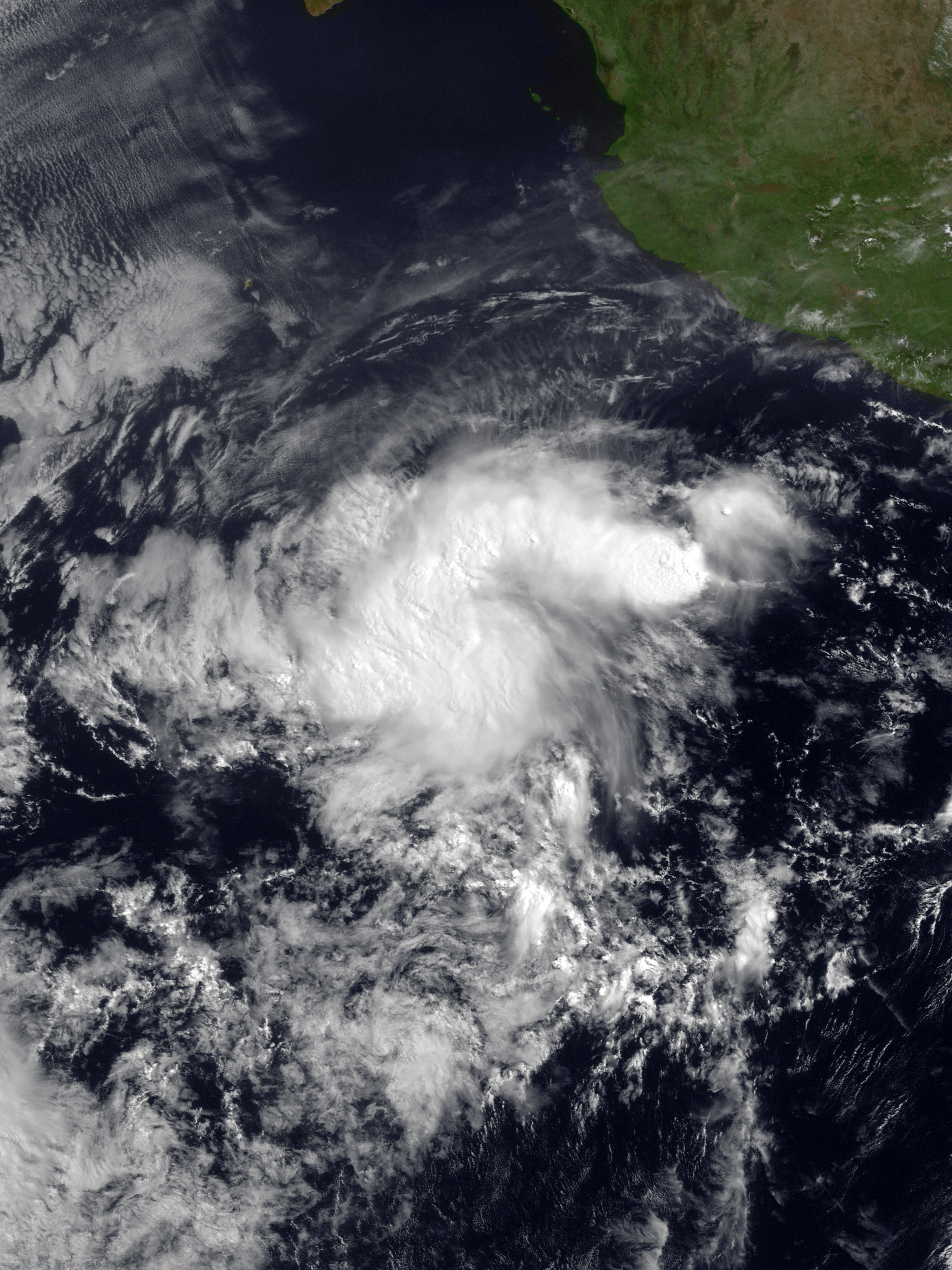
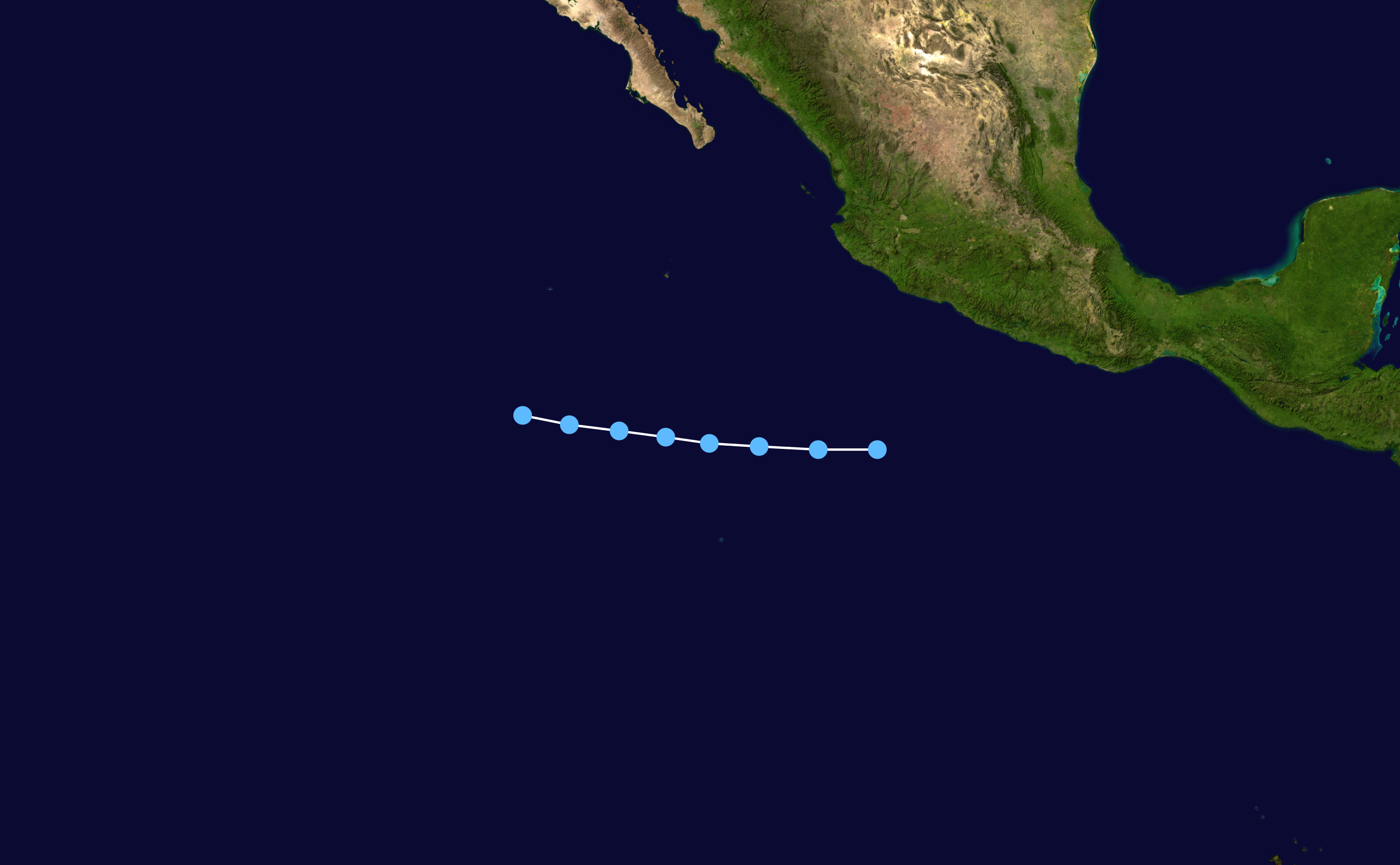
- Duration: May 21 – May 23
- Peak intensity: 35 mph (55 km/h) (1-min); 1005 mbar (hPa)

A westward-moving tropical wave entered the Pacific Ocean in mid-May. Convection within the disturbance became more concentrated and organized on May 19 while the wave was located a short distance south of the Gulf of Tehuantepec. The deep convection concentrated around a low-level circulation with expanding outflow, and the system developed into Tropical Depression One-E on May 21, while located about 400 mi (640 km) south of Manzanillo, Mexico. Outflow increased as the storm moved through an area of warm waters and a favorable upper-level environment, and two satellite classifications indicated the system was at tropical storm status around nine hours after forming. Despite the favorable environment and satellite classifications of tropical storm status, the depression failed to organize further. The convection and organization continued to decrease, and on May 23 the depression dissipated.

While it was developing, locally moderate to heavy rainfall fell across southern Mexico along the disturbance's northern periphery, with rainfall totals peaking at 5.18 inches (132 mm) at Vallecitos/Petatlan.

=== Hurricane Adolph ===
- Category 4 hurricane (SSHWS)
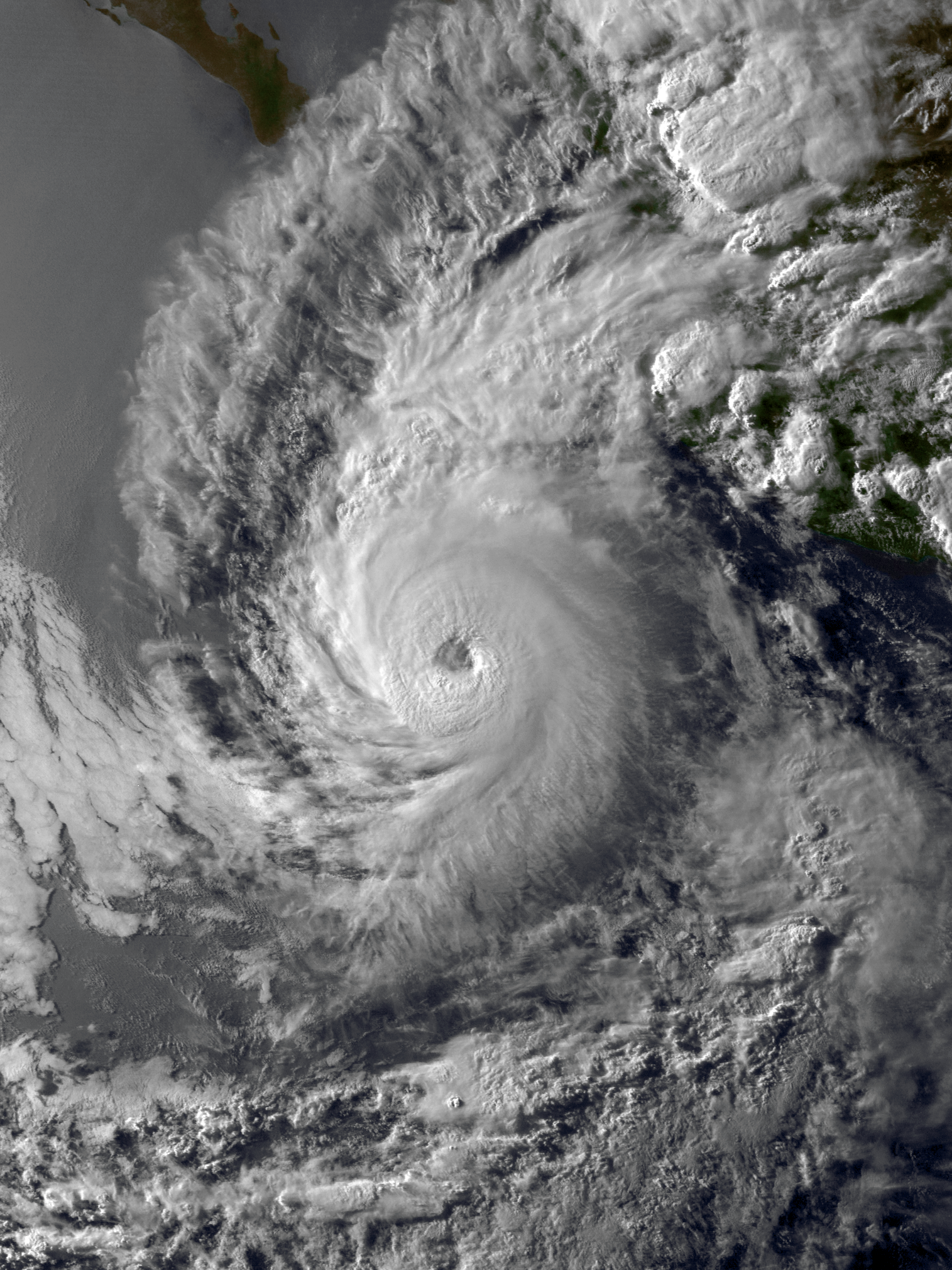
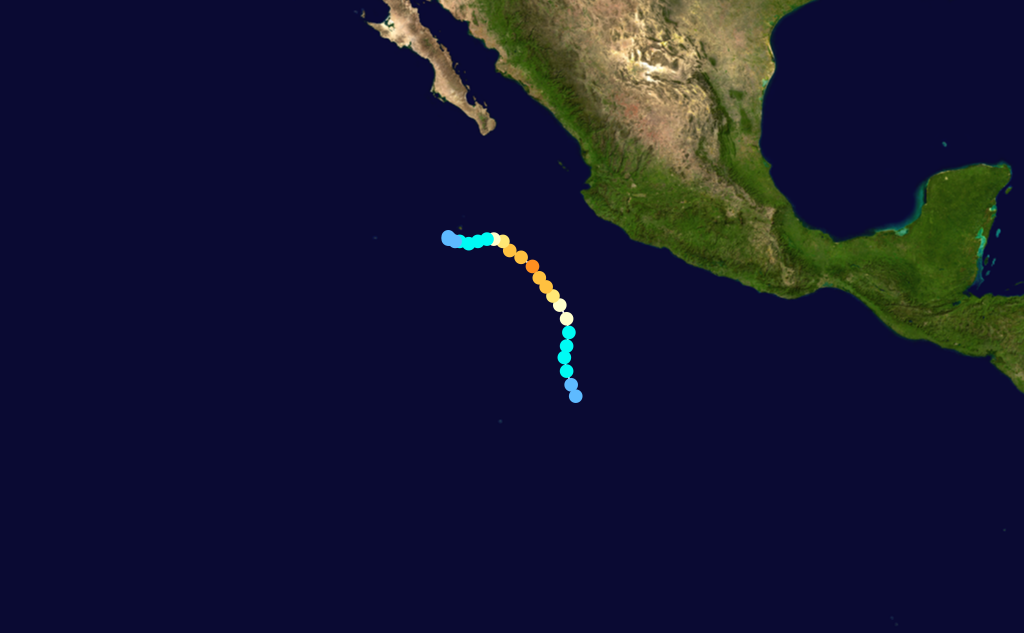
- Duration: June 15 – June 21
- Peak intensity: 130 mph (215 km/h) (1-min); 948 mbar (hPa)

An area of disturbed weather associated with a tropical wave organized off the southwest coast of Mexico during the middle of June. Banding features developed as a circulation persisted on the northeast side of its deep convection, and the system developed into Tropical Depression Two-E on June 15. Under weak steering currents, the depression moved slowly northward, and with deep convection organizing near its center, the depression intensified to Tropical Storm Adolph on June 16. Located in an area of warm waters, Adolph exhibited a well-defined outflow pattern, and rapidly strengthened to attain hurricane status on June 17 as a banding-type eye developed. Hurricane Adolph turned to the northwest and attained major hurricane status late that same day. The small eye of the hurricane continued to organize, as very deep convection surrounded the eyewall, and Adolph reached its peak intensity of 135 mph (217 km/h) on June 18, making it a Category 4 hurricane on the Saffir-Simpson scale. Shortly thereafter, the storm weakened, as the upper-level environment became more hostile, and the system moved over progressively cooler waters. On June 19, Adolph turned to the west, and degenerated back into a tropical storm later that day. On June 20, the storm weakened to a tropical depression, and on June 21, Adolph began to dissipate as its center became devoid of deep convection.

As Adolph moved north towards Mexico while about 290 mi (470 km) off the coast, the Mexican government briefly issued a tropical storm warning and a hurricane watch from Punta Tejupan to Cabo Corrientes, Jalisco.

=== Hurricane Barbara ===
- Category 4 hurricane (SSHWS)
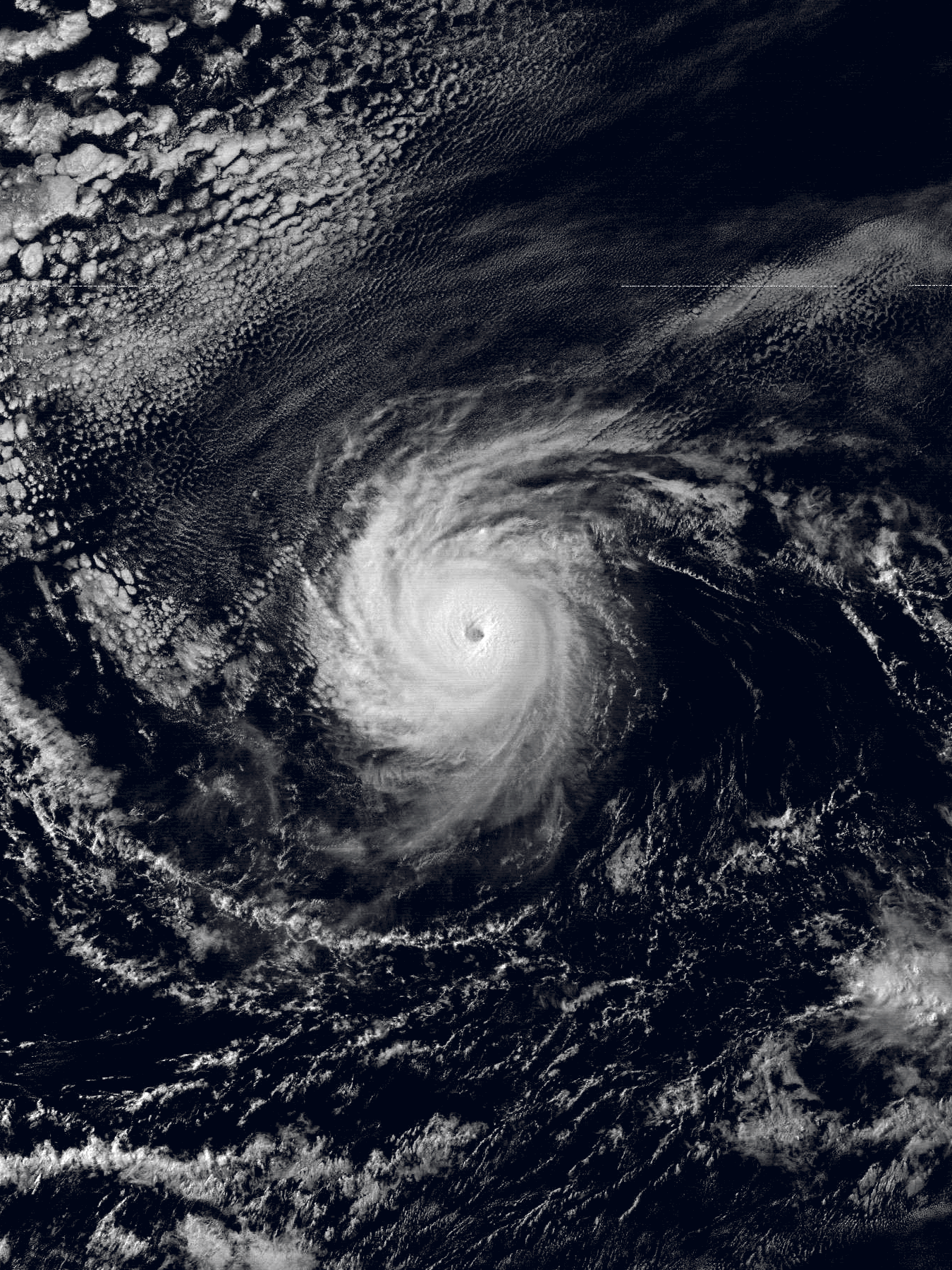
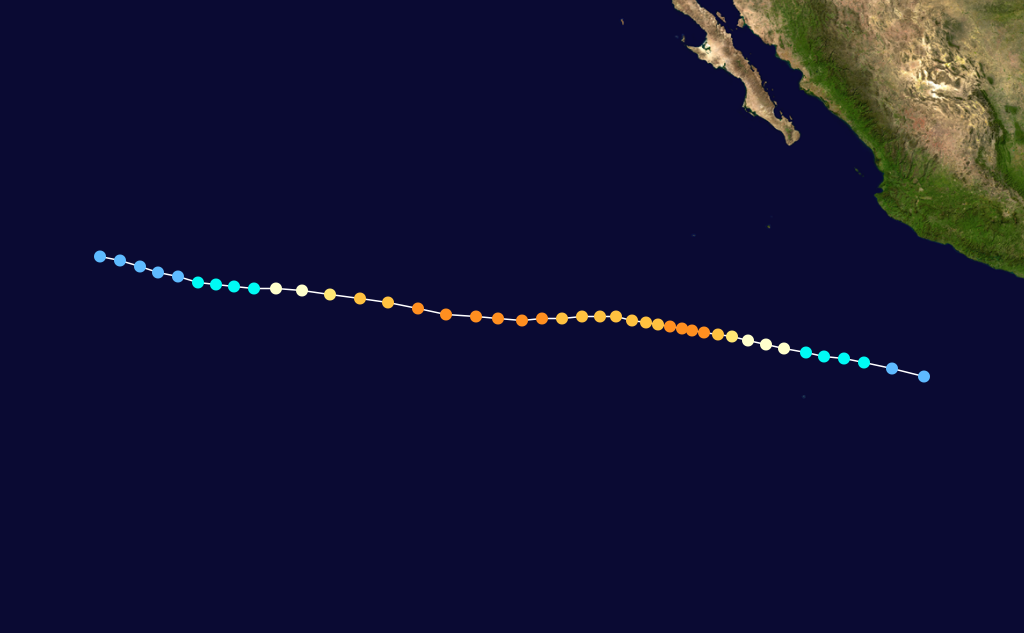
- Duration: July 7 – July 18
- Peak intensity: 140 mph (220 km/h) (1-min); 940 mbar (hPa)

A few days later, on June 24, another weak tropical wave moved off the coast of Africa. It moved steadily westward through the Atlantic Ocean without any development, and entered the eastern Pacific Ocean on July 5. At this point, convection developed along the wave axis, and the system gradually organized. A circulation developed as it passed through an area of warm waters, and the system developed into Tropical Depression Three-E on July 7, while located about 600 miles (970 km) south of Manzanillo, Colima. Although the outer rainbands warmed slightly in the hours after the formation, the convection near the center deepened further with favorable upper-level outflow, and the depression strengthened into Tropical Storm Barbara early on July 8. Barbara steadily intensified, and following the development of a ragged eye that night, Barbara strengthened into a hurricane on July 9, while located about 700 miles (1,100 km) south of the southern tip of Baja California Peninsula.

After moving into an area of light vertical shear and warm water temperatures, Barbara quickly intensified to reach major hurricane status on July 10. The eye continued to become better organized, and Barbara attained winds of 135 mph (217 km/h) later on July 10. After maintaining its intensity for 24 hours, increased wind shear from an upper-tropospheric trough degraded the appearance of the deepest convection, and the eye became obscured from satellite images. After weakening to a 115 mph (185 km/h) hurricane, Barbara maintained its intensity for 30 hours before moving into an area with very warm waters and a favorable upper-level environment. On July 13, the hurricane re-organized, a distinct eye again developed, and Barbara strengthened to reach its peak intensity of 140 mph (230 km/h) later that day. Barbara continued westward under the influence of a subtropical ridge to its north, and began to steadily weaken on July 14 as it moved into an area of cooler water temperatures. The hurricane degraded to a tropical storm on July 16, and a day later it deteriorated to a tropical depression. As a depression with little to no convection near its center, Barbara continued west-northwestward until dissipating on July 18 while located 720 mi (1,160 km) east-southeast of Hilo, Hawaii.

=== Hurricane Cosme ===
- Category 1 hurricane (SSHWS)
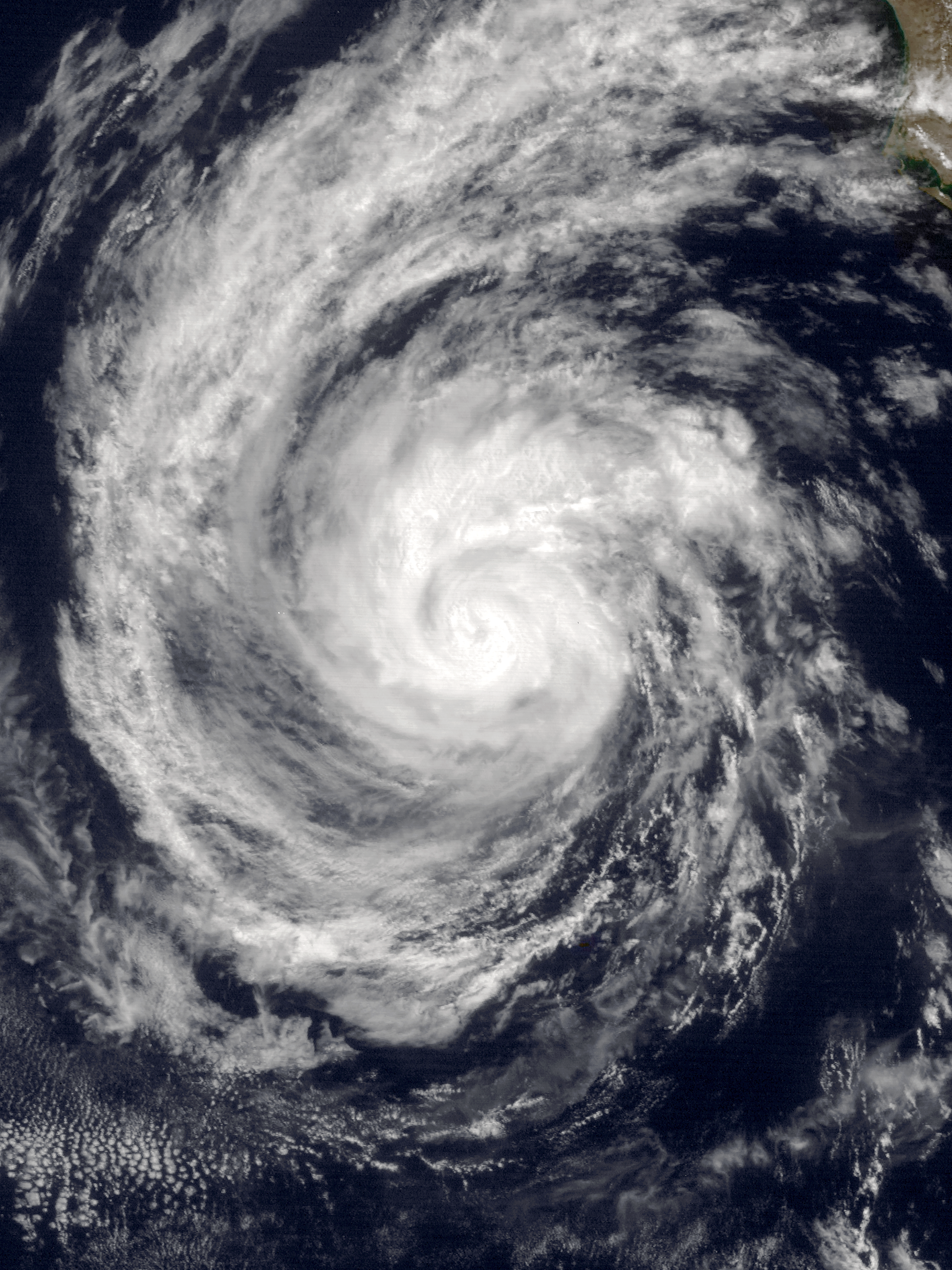
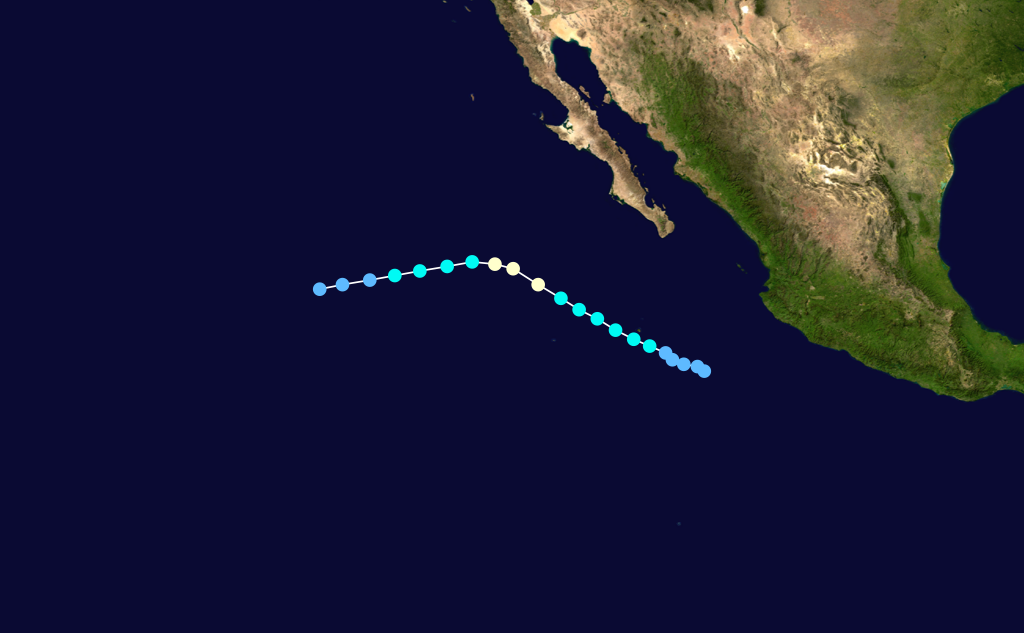
- Duration: July 17 – July 22
- Peak intensity: 75 mph (120 km/h) (1-min); 985 mbar (hPa)

As Barbara moved away from land, another area of disturbed weather moved off the coast of Central America on July 11. Moving westward, this area slowly organized, and developed a low-level circulation on July 22. The convection developed into curved rainbands, and based on Dvorak classifications of 35 mph (56 km/h), the National Hurricane Center estimated that the system developed into Tropical Depression Four-E on July 17, while located about 400 mi (640 km) south-southeast of the southern tip of Baja California Peninsula. As the depression was situated in an area with warm waters and moderate upper-level outflow, the system was forecast to slowly intensify to a 50 mph (80 km/h) tropical storm. Initially, the depression followed the forecasts, and it intensified into a tropical storm about 30 hours after developing, receiving the name "Cosme". Cosme was expected to strengthen only slightly due to predicted cooler waters and increased shear.

On July 18, contrary to the predictions, Cosme became much better organized, and well-defined banding features were visible on satellite imagery. The storm continued to steadily intensify, and subsequent to the development of an eye, Cosme strengthened into a hurricane late on July 19, while located 380 miles (610 km) west-southwest of the southern tip of Baja California Peninsula. After maintaining hurricane status for 18 hours, Cosme weakened back to a tropical storm on July 20. Cooler water temperatures deteriorated the convection near the center, resulting in Cosme quickly weakening to a tropical depression on July 21. After turning to the west-southwest, Cosme dissipated on July 22. Cosme never affected land, and as a result caused no damage or fatalities. However, the intensity of the storm is still uncertain; late on July 18, a ship 70 mi (110 km) to the east of Cosme reported winds of 17 mph (27 km/h), despite that a normal 50 mph (80 km/h) tropical storm would produce tropical storm force winds for locations within at least 70 mi (110 km) of the center.

=== Tropical Storm Dalila ===
- Tropical storm (SSHWS)
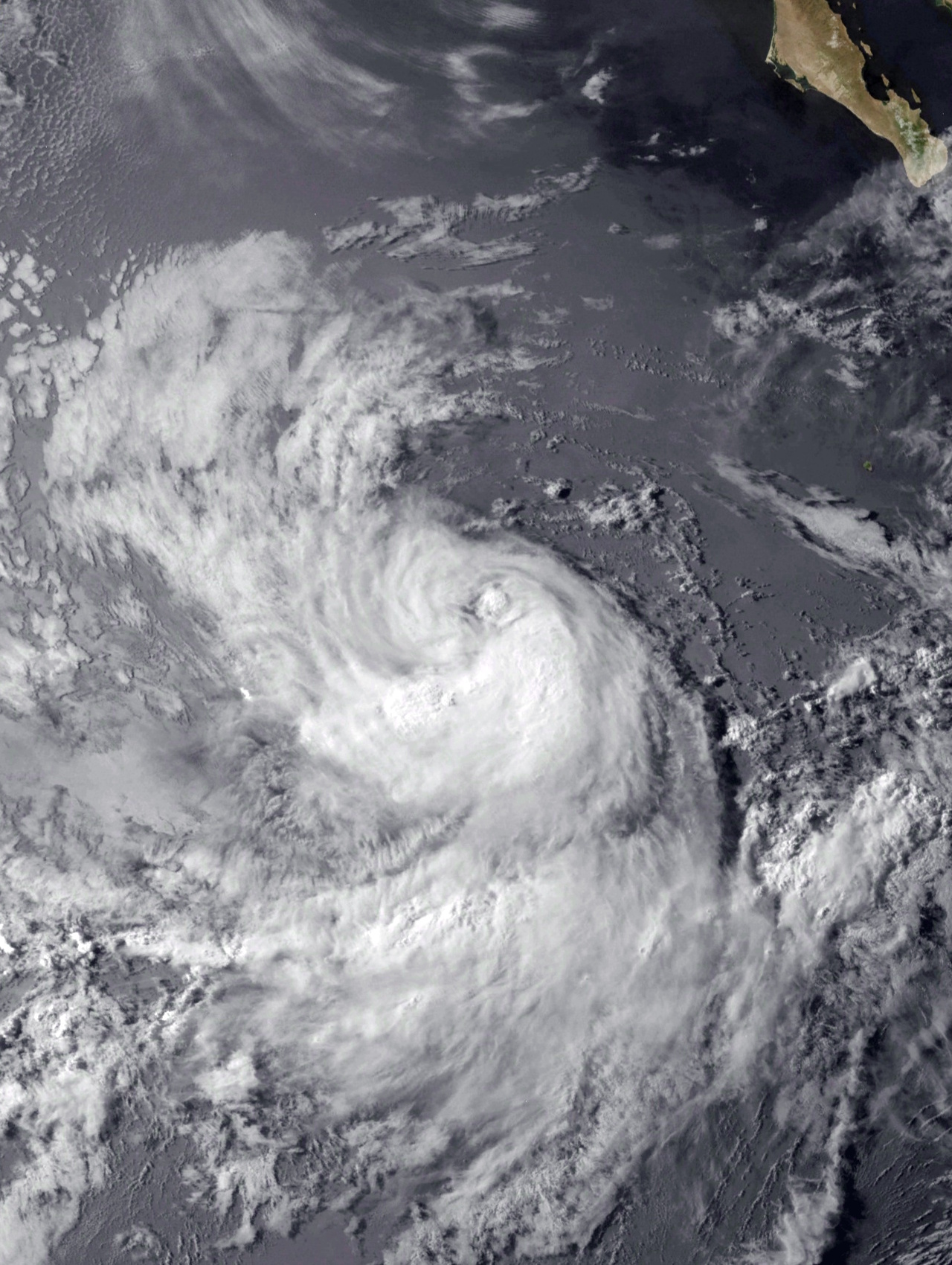
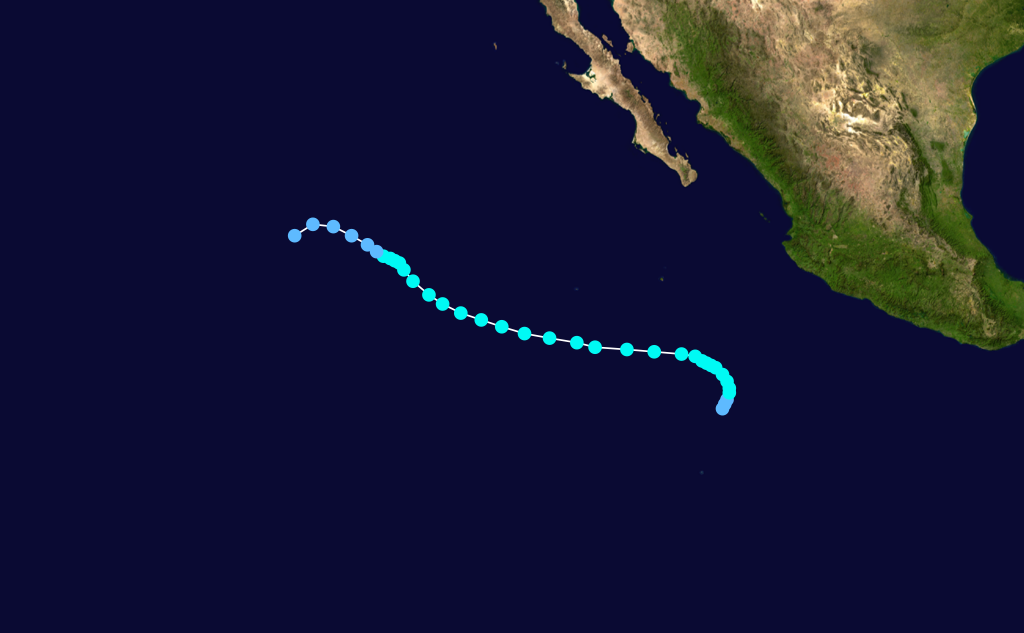
- Duration: July 24 – August 2
- Peak intensity: 65 mph (100 km/h) (1-min); 994 mbar (hPa)

A tropical wave moved off the coast of Africa on July 11. It moved westward and quickly developed two areas of convection along the wave axis. One of the areas nearly developed into a tropical depression after moving northwestward, though it failed to organize further and dissipated. The southern area continued westward and ultimately entered the eastern Pacific Ocean on July 21. Thunderstorms along the wave axis became more concentrated a few hundred miles south of the Gulf of Tehuantepec, and the system developed into Tropical Depression Five-E on July 24 while located 500 mi (800 km) southwest of Manzanillo, Mexico.

Located in an area of weak steering currents and easterly wind shear, the tropical depression drifted to the north-northeast while the convection was displaced up to 70 mi (110 km) west of the circulation. Slightly strengthening occurred, and on July 25 the depression intensified into Tropical Storm Dalila. The storm turned to the northwest, and later to the west-northwest, and remained a minimal tropical storm until July 28 when a decrease in wind shear allowed Dalila to strengthen. A strong anticyclone developed to the north of the system, causing Dalila to accelerate to the northwest. Late on July 28, Dalila reached a peak intensity of 65 mph (105 km/h) at a position 570 mi (920 km) southwest of Cabo San Lucas. Tropical Storm Dalila slowly weakened after moving over progressively cooler water temperatures, and on August 1 it degenerated into a tropical depression. Dalila turned to the southwest after much of the convection waned, and the system dissipated on August 2.

=== Tropical Storm Erick ===
- Tropical storm (SSHWS)
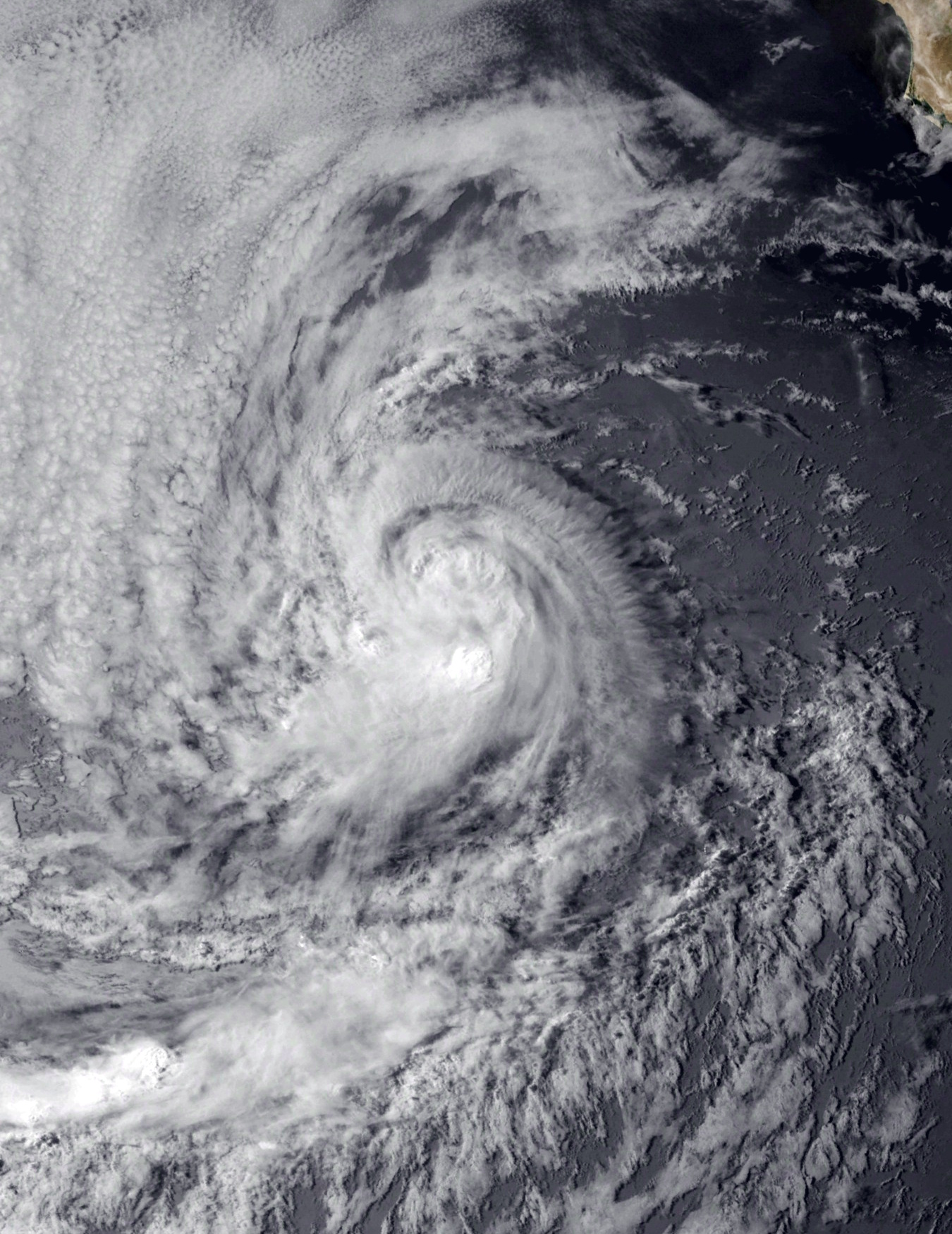
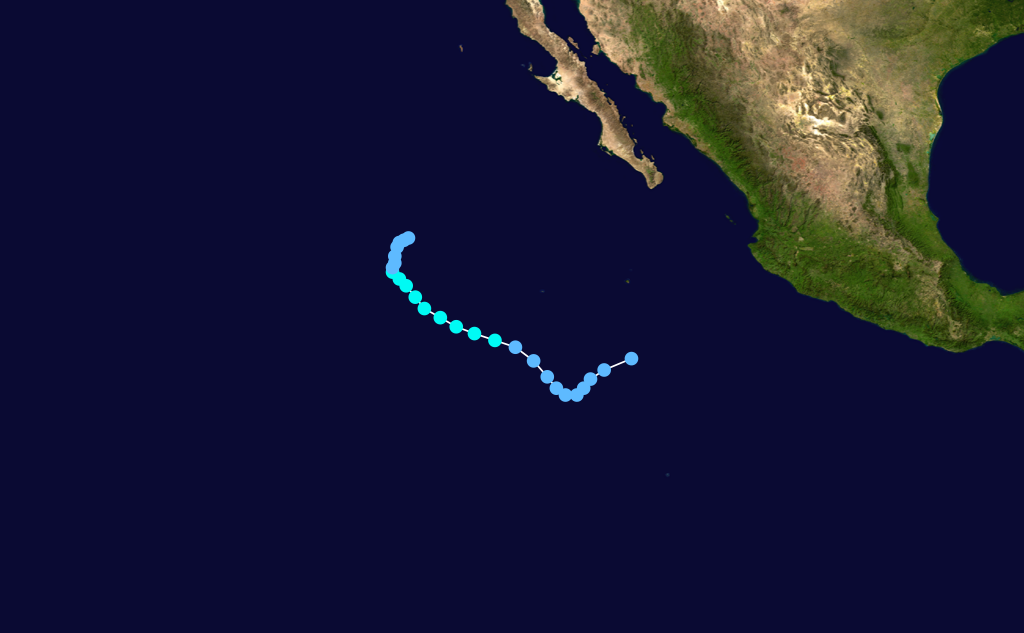
- Duration: August 1 – August 8
- Peak intensity: 65 mph (100 km/h) (1-min); 994 mbar (hPa)

On July 17 a tropical wave exited the coast of Africa, and moved westward. An area of convection along the wave organized slightly on July 18, though the next day the convection diminished. After moving through the Windward Islands on July 23, deep convection again increased. The system failed to organize further, though convection continued to develop upon entering the eastern Pacific Ocean on July 27. The cloudiness and thunderstorms became more consolidated off the coast of southern Mexico, and on July 31 Dvorak classifications began on the system. A circulation developed, and the system organized into Tropical Depression Six-E on August 1 while located about 520 mi (840 km) south of the southern tip of Baja California Peninsula.

Initially, the depression was a small system with moderate amounts of easterly wind shear. It organized slowly, and after moving to the southwest for 24 hours it turned to the northwest. Subsequent to an increase in convection over the center, the depression intensified into Tropical Storm Erick on August 4. Erick gradually strengthened as it moved to the west-northwest, and reached peak winds of 65 mph (105 km/h) on August 5 while located about 720 miles (1,160 km) southwest of Cabo San Lucas. The mid-level ridge which had been tracking Erick westward weakened, resulting in Erick to turn to the north over cooler waters. It quickly weakened to a tropical depression on August 6, and after turning to an eastward drift Erick dissipated on August 8 while located 700 mi (1,100 km) west-southwest of the southern tip of Baja California Peninsula.

=== Hurricane Flossie ===
- Category 1 hurricane (SSHWS)
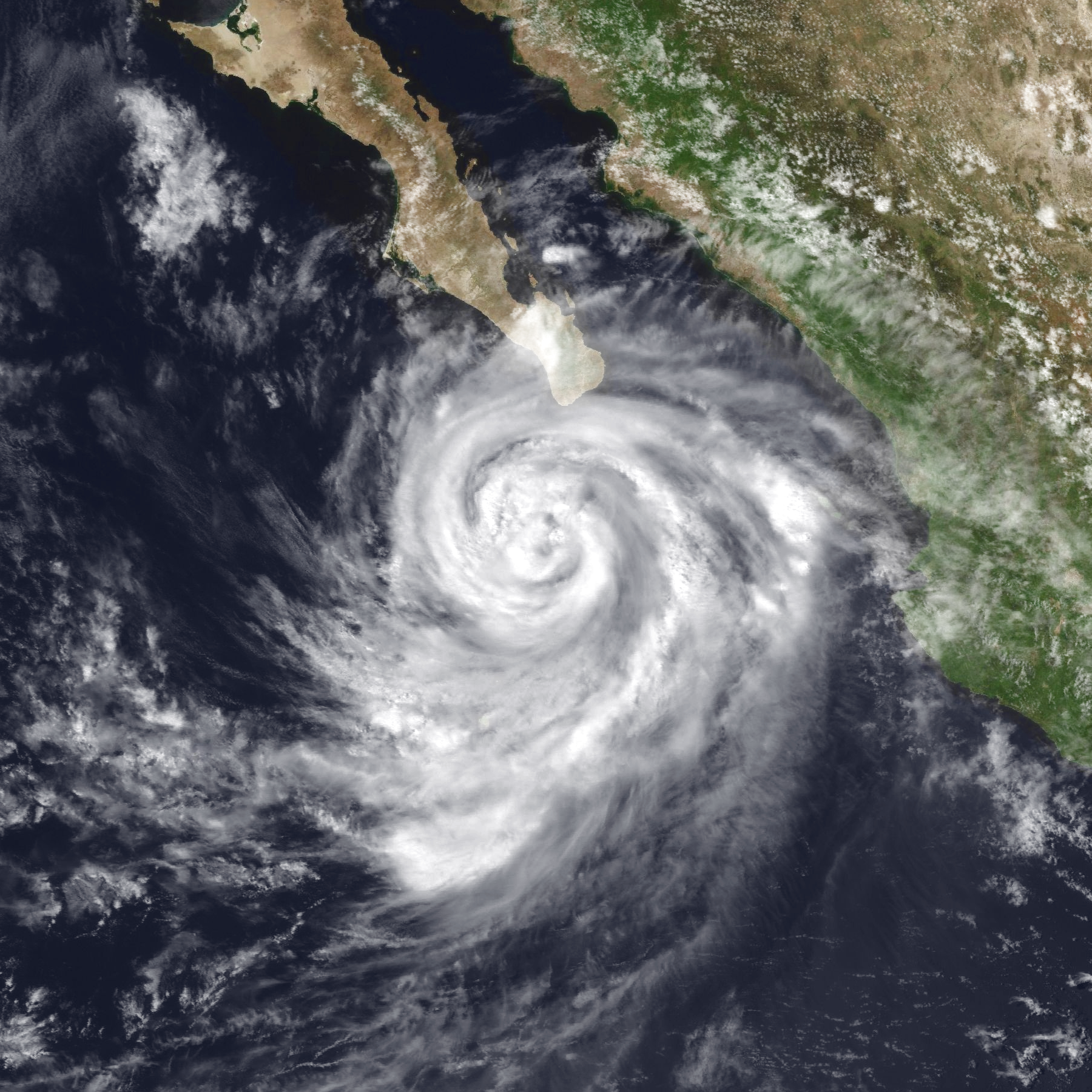
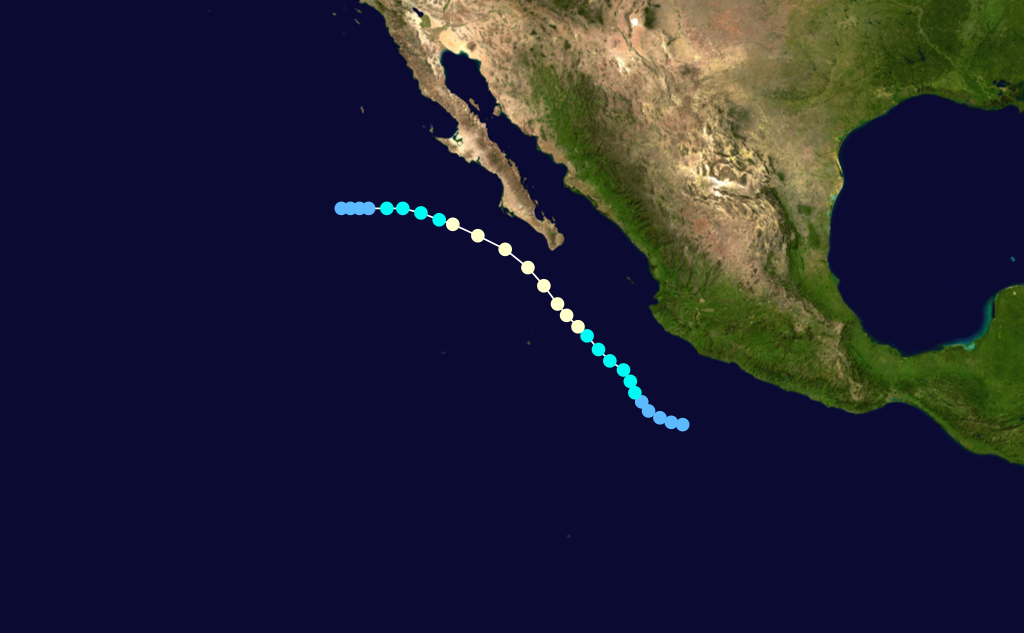
- Duration: August 7 – August 14
- Peak intensity: 80 mph (130 km/h) (1-min); 978 mbar (hPa)

A large circulation with an area of low pressure persisted in the tropical eastern Pacific Ocean in early August. The large circulation was well-developed by August 7, and the convection concentrated a few hundred miles southwest of Acapulco. Based on its organization, the National Hurricane Center designated the system Tropical Depression Seven-E. On August 8, the depression intensified into Tropical Storm Flossie, based on ship reports. The storm paralleled the coast of Mexico as it moved northwestward, and after a decrease of wind shear Flossie developed very deep convection over its center. It intensified into a hurricane on August 10, reaching peak winds of 80 mph (130 km/h) as an embedded warm spot appeared in the center of the storm. After maintaining its peak intensity for 18 hours and passing within 75 mi (121 km) of Baja California Peninsula, Flossie weakened over cooler waters and degenerated to a tropical storm on August 12. The storm continued to weaken, and early on August 14 Flossie dissipated.

The government of Mexico issued a tropical storm warning from Punta Tejupan to Cabo Corrientes early in its life, though it was discontinued shortly thereafter. Officials issued a tropical storm watch and later a warning for Baja California Sur south of La Paz, which was later extended from Loreto on the east coast to San Juanico on the west coast. The large circulation of Hurricane Flossie produced gusty winds along the west coast of Mexico and southern Baja California Peninsula. Cabo San Lucas reported a gust of 55 mph (89 km/h), and San José del Cabo recorded a gust of 65 mph (105 km/h). The storm produced heavy rainfall, peaking at 9.72 in (247 mm) at San Felipe/Los Cabos. Seven people died in Mexico from the storm, including two that drowned in Cabo San Lucas. A monsoon surge moving around its eastern periphery produced heavy rainfall in the American Southwest. Flooding from the rainfall killed one person and left eleven motorists stranded. Thunderstorms in Tucson, Arizona, produced hurricane-force wind gusts which caused widespread power outages and damage. Damage from the storm in Arizona totaled $5 million (1995 USD).

=== Tropical Storm Gil ===
- Tropical storm (SSHWS)
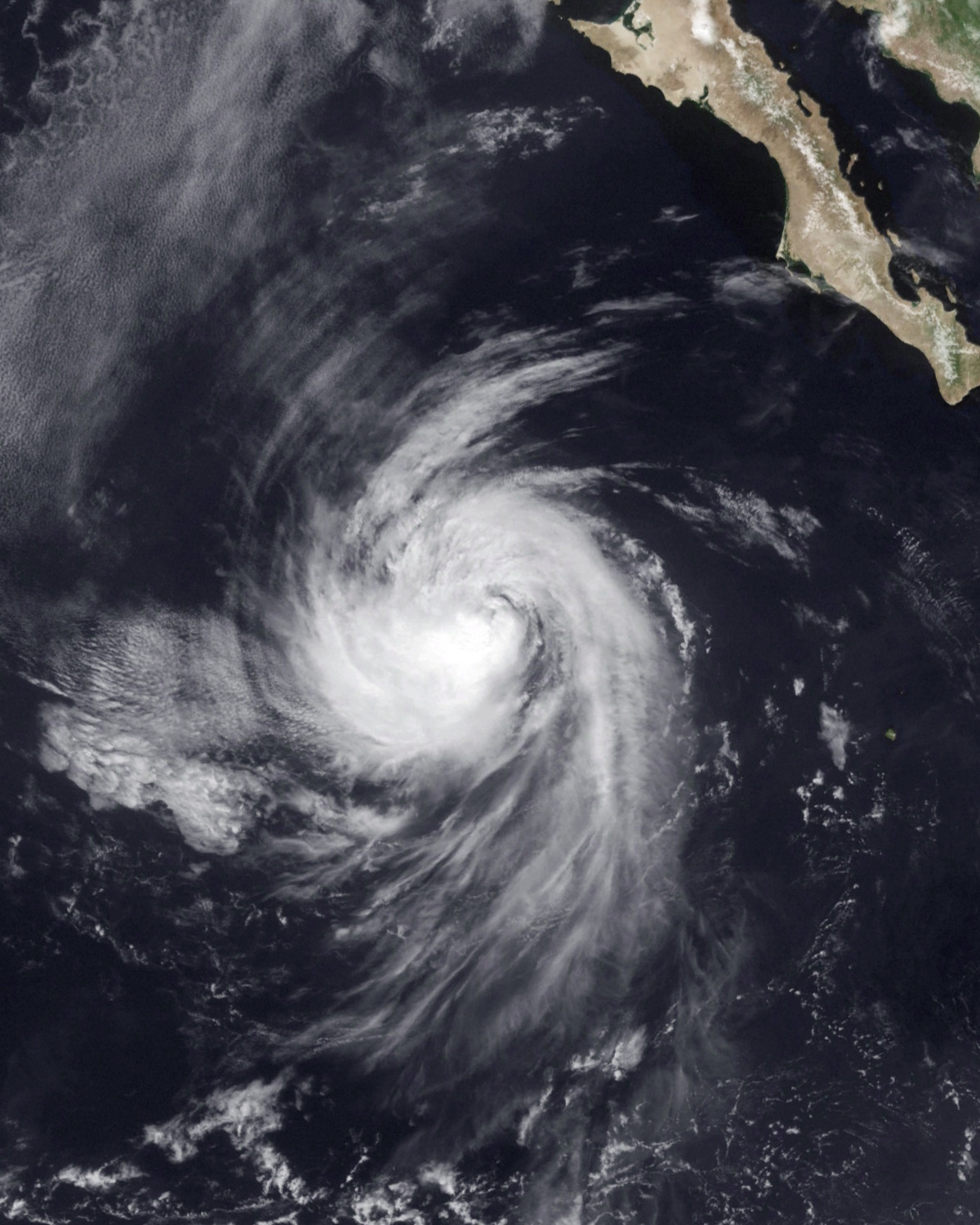
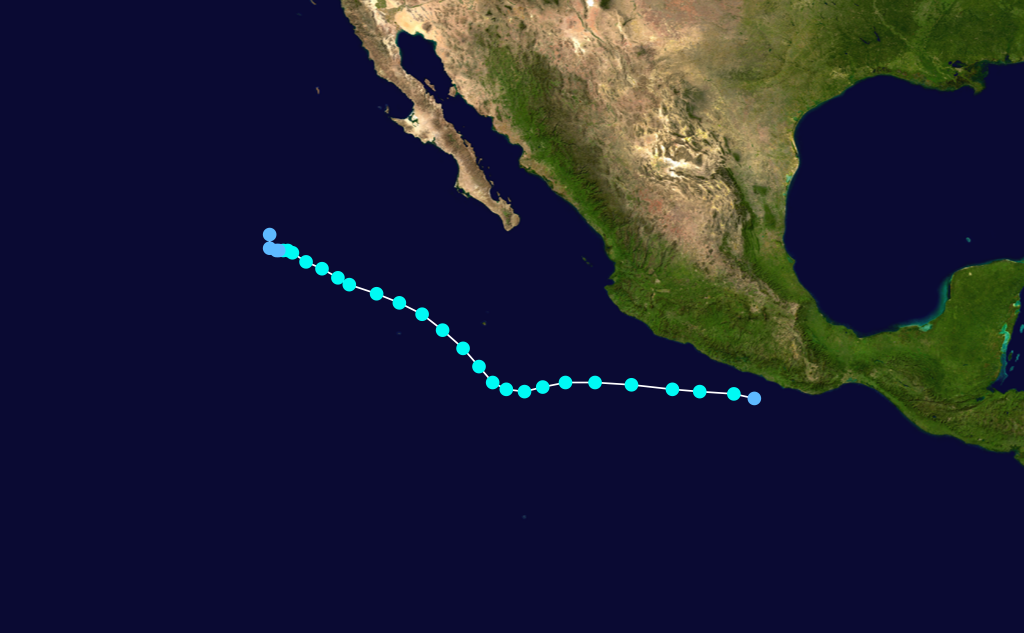
- Duration: August 19 – August 27
- Peak intensity: 65 mph (100 km/h) (1-min); 993 mbar (hPa)

An area of disturbed weather, possibly related to a tropical wave, persisted and gradually organized in the Gulf of Tehuantepec. A circulation developed within its deep convection, and the system organized into Tropical Depression Seven-E on August 19 while located about 115 mi (185 km) southeast of Acapulco. Operationally, it was not until 15 hours later that the National Hurricane Center initiated advisories on the system. The depression moved westward and quickly intensified into a tropical storm. A nearby ship confirmed the existence of tropical storm force winds, and Gil reached winds of 50 mph (80 km/h) early on August 21. With well-defined outflow and continually developing convection, forecasters predicted Gil to strengthen more and attain hurricane status within two days of becoming a tropical storm. However, increased northeasterly wind shear initially prevented further strengthening.

On August 22, the cloud pattern of Gil became better organized, though the low-level circulation was located to the northeast of the deep convection due to the wind shear. The shear also limited outflow to the east, preventing further strengthening. Gradually the convection developed nearer to the center. After Gil turned to the northwest, the deep convection organized into a central dense overcast, and it strengthened to reach winds of 60 mph (97 km/h) on August 24. Later that day the storm attained a peak strength of 65 mph (105 km/h) while located 380 mi (610 km) southwest of the southern tip of Baja California Peninsula. After maintaining its peak strength for 30 hours, Gil moved over progressively cooler waters, and weakened to a tropical depression on August 26. The depression drifted westward and later turned to the north, and dissipated on August 27 while located 670 mi (1,080 km) to the west of Cabo San Lucas. While located a short distance off of Mexico, Gil produced heavy rainfall near the coast.

=== Hurricane Henriette ===
- Category 2 hurricane (SSHWS)
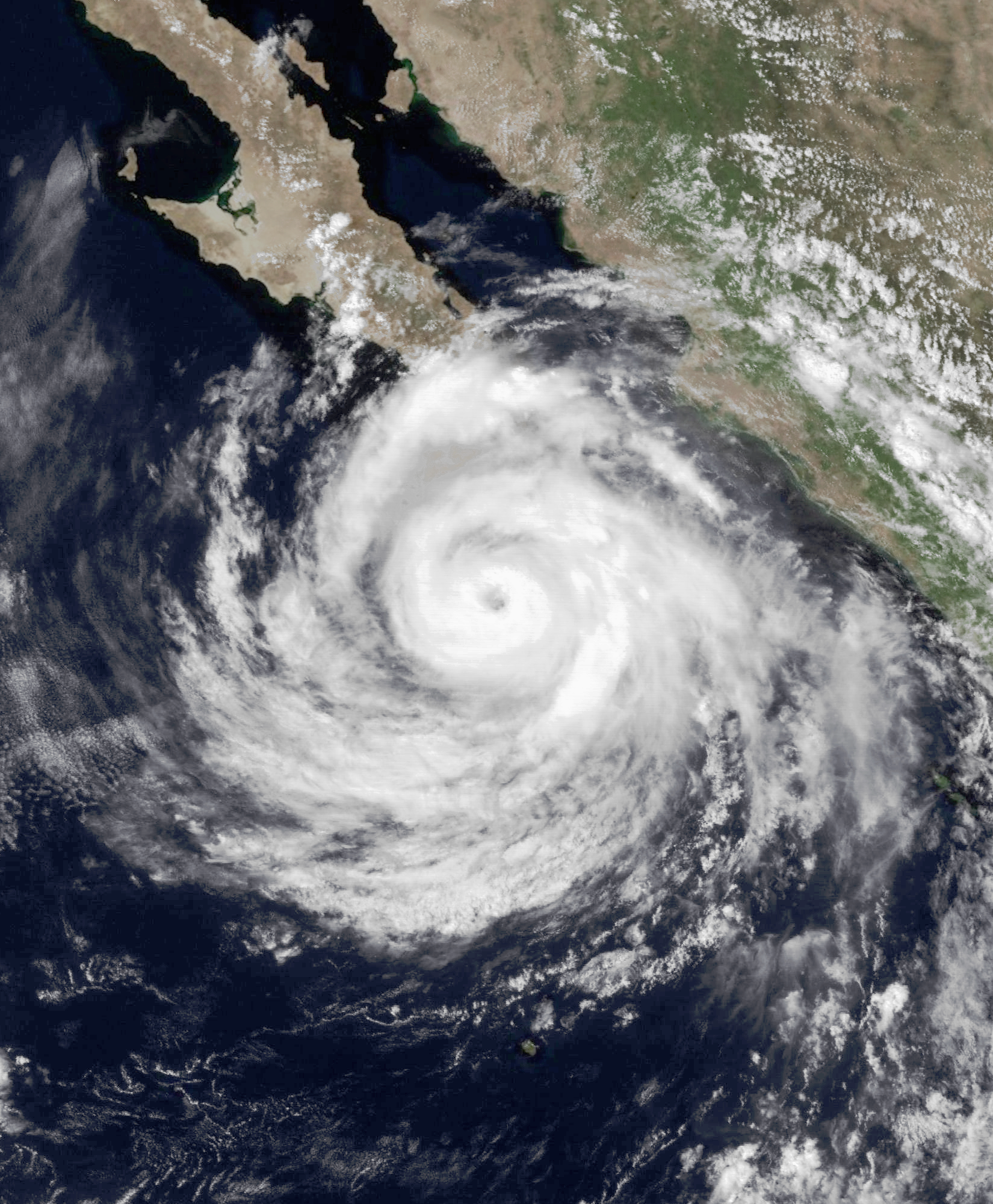
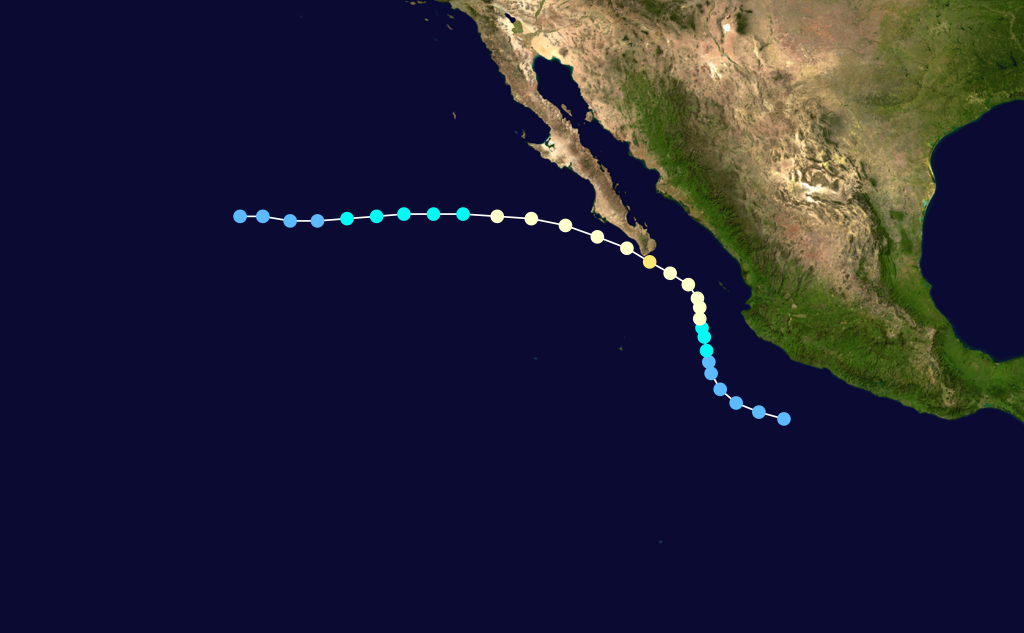
- Duration: September 1 – September 8
- Peak intensity: 100 mph (155 km/h) (1-min); 970 mbar (hPa)

A tropical wave moved off the coast of Africa and entered the eastern Pacific Ocean. The system quickly developed deep convection and a low-level circulation, and on September 1 it organized into Tropical Depression Nine-E while located about 170 miles (270 km) off the southwest coast of Mexico. The depression initially moved west-northwestward, and shortly after forming it turned north-northwest. Under favorable conditions, the depression slowly strengthened to become Tropical Storm Henriette on September 2. By later that day, the convection wrapped around the center of circulation and Henriette quickly intensified into a hurricane on September 3.

Late on September 3, an eye began to form in the center of the deep convection as Henriette turned northwest. The eye became better defined the next day, and Henriette attained a peak intensity of 100 mph (160 km/h) as the northern portion of the eyewall moved over southern Baja California Peninsula. The hurricane quickly crossed the southern tip of Baja California Peninsula and weakened as it emerged into the Pacific Ocean again. Convection gradually waned as the hurricane moved over progressively colder waters, and on September 6 Henriette weakened to a tropical depression. The storm turned west and dissipated on September 8.

On September 2, a few hours after Henriette became a tropical storm, the government of Mexico issued tropical cyclone warnings and watches for Baja California Peninsula. The threat of Hurricane Henriette prompted a Carnival Cruise Line ship to alter their route. Originally planned to tour Mexican ports, the captain turned the ship to tour the southern California coastline. Many upset passengers demanded refunds, to which the cruise line offered discounts for future cruises and a $40 credit card during their cruise. Winds of up to 100 mph (160 km/h) in southern Baja California Sur left much of Cabo San Lucas without water or power. Overall, 2,000 people were directly affected by the hurricane. A strong storm surge produced flooding and heavy road damage in the state. Approximately 800 people were forced from their homes, and crop damage was reported. Generally up to 10 inches (250 mm) of rain fell on land, though peak precipitation exceeded 13 inches (330 mm).

=== Hurricane Ismael ===
- Category 1 hurricane (SSHWS)
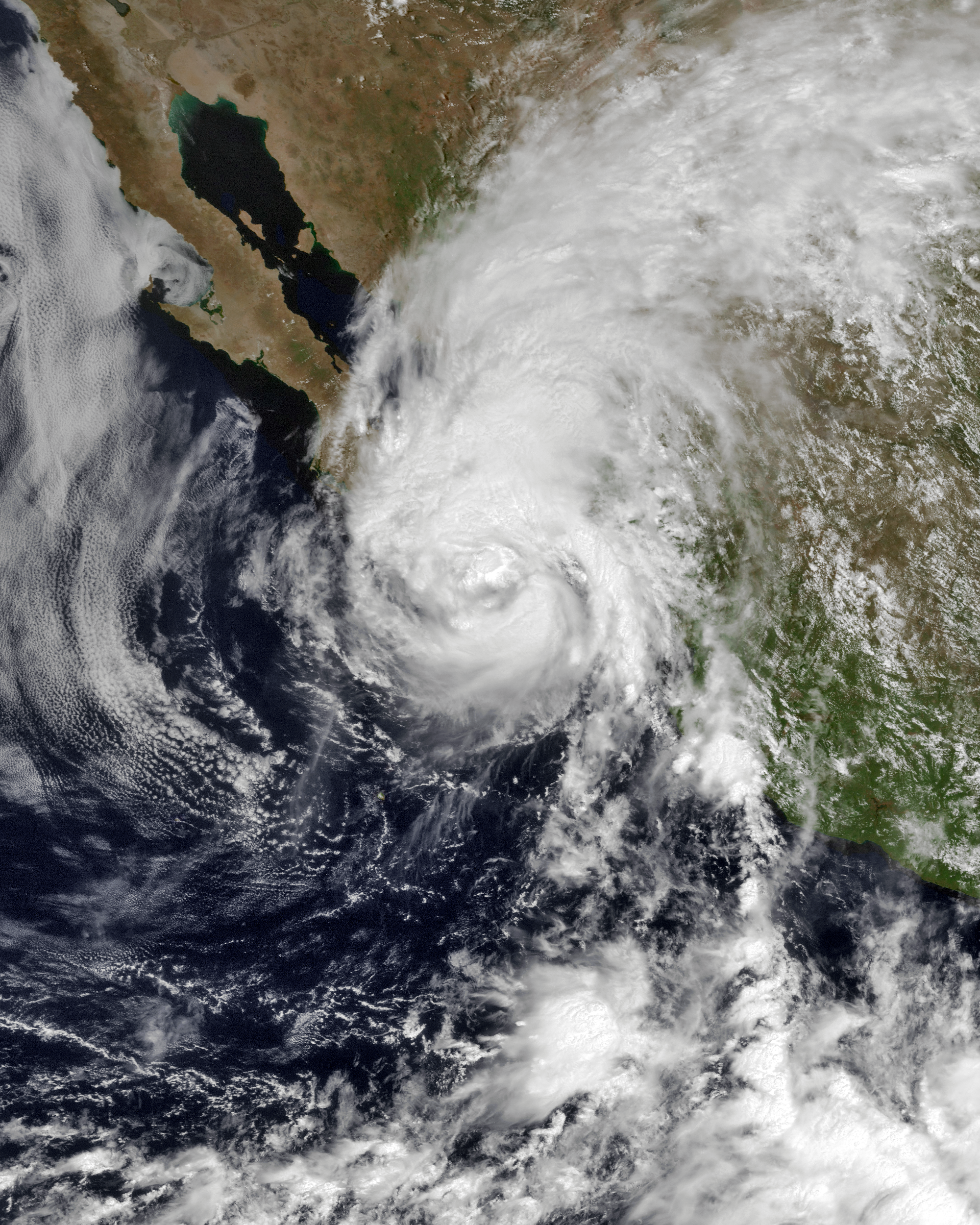
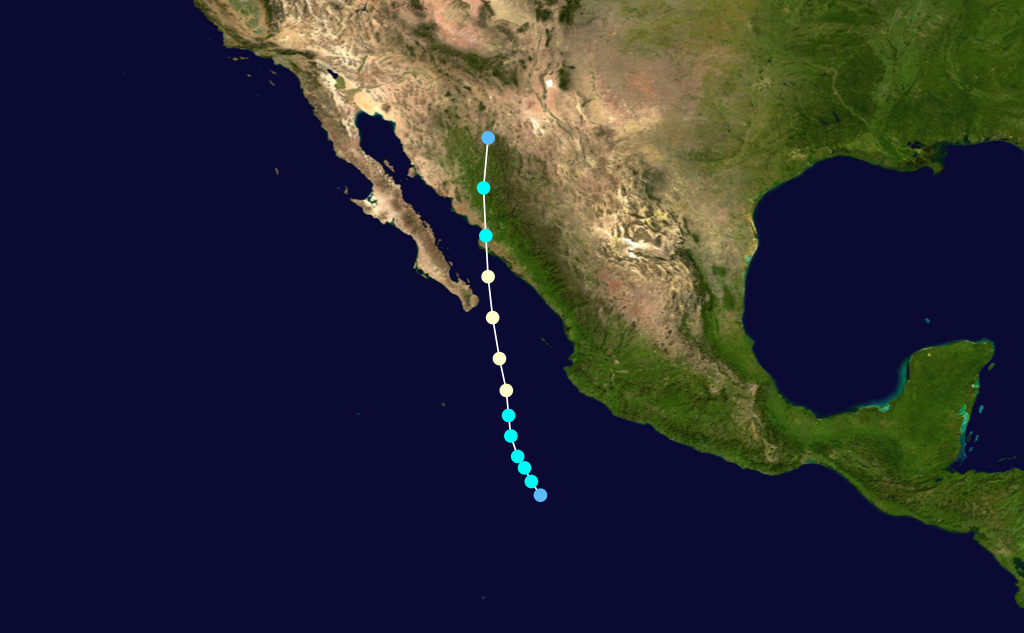
- Duration: September 12 – September 16
- Peak intensity: 80 mph (130 km/h) (1-min); 983 mbar (hPa)

Hurricane Ismael developed from a persistent area of deep convection on September 12, and steadily strengthened as it moved to the north-northwest. Ismael attained hurricane status on September 14 while located 210 mi (340 km) off the coast of Mexico. It continued to the north, and after passing a short distance east of Baja California Peninsula it made landfall on Topolobampo in the state of Sinaloa with winds of 80 mph (130 km/h). Ismael rapidly weakened over land, and dissipated on September 16 over northwestern Mexico. The remnants entered the United States and extended eastward into the mid-Atlantic states.

Offshore, Ismael produced waves of up to 30 ft (9.1 m) in height. Hundreds of fishermen were unprepared by the hurricane, which was expected to move more slowly, and as a result 52 ships were wrecked, killing 57 fishermen. The hurricane destroyed thousands of houses, leaving 30,000 people homeless. On land, Ismael caused 59 casualties in mainland Mexico and resulted in $26 million in damage (1995 USD; $54.9 million 2026 USD). Moisture from the storm extended into the United States, causing heavy rainfall and localized moderate damage in southeastern New Mexico.

=== Hurricane Juliette ===
- Category 4 hurricane (SSHWS)
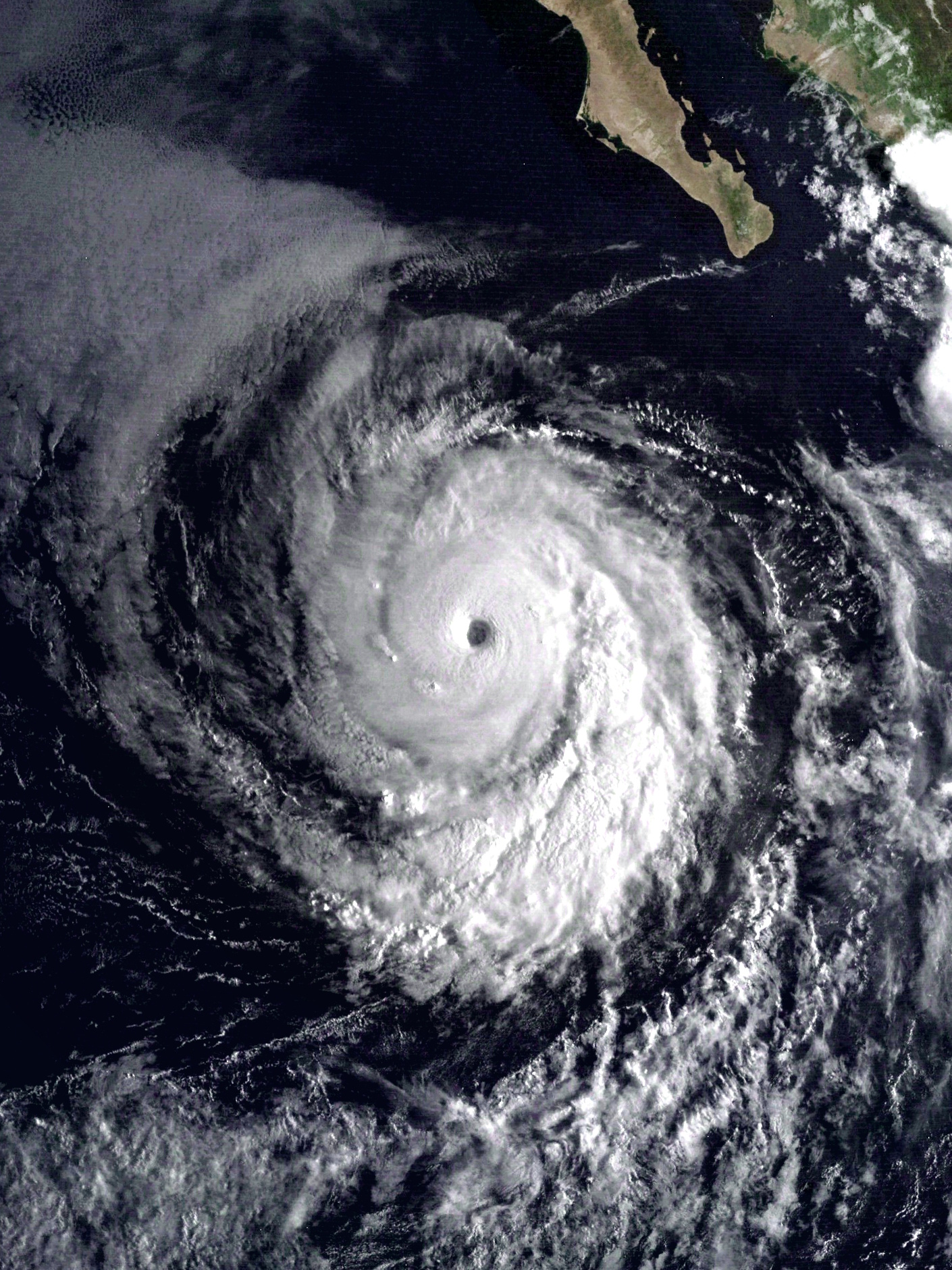
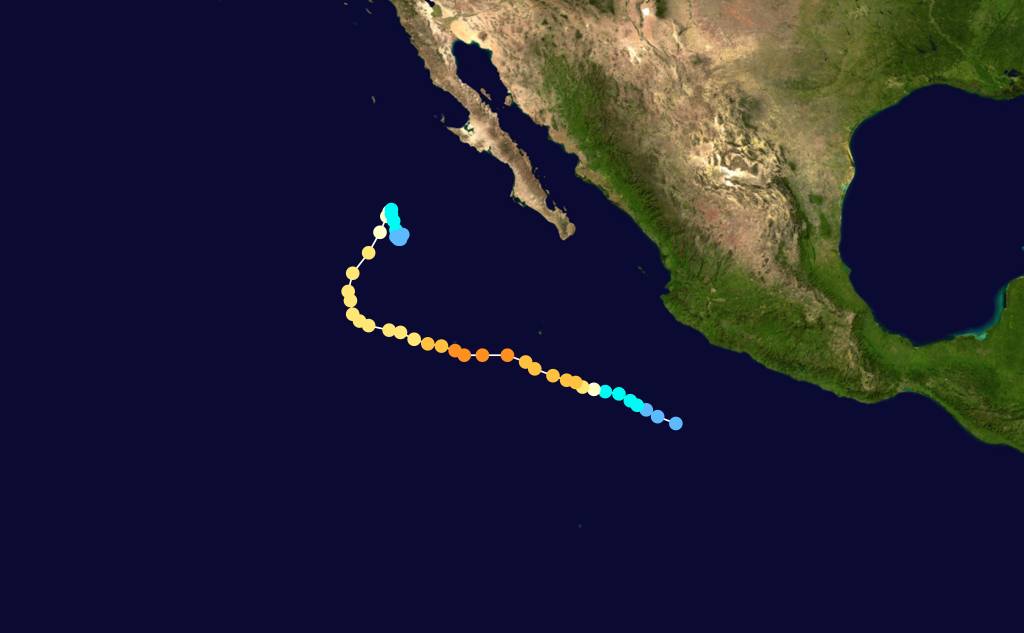
- Duration: September 16 – September 26
- Peak intensity: 150 mph (240 km/h) (1-min); 930 mbar (hPa)

A tropical wave moved off the coast of Africa behind Hurricane Luis on August 31. Strong outflow from Luis prevented development of the wave, and it continued westward until crossing into the eastern Pacific Ocean on September 12. Convection increased as it moved through the Gulf of Tehuantepec, and the cloud pattern organized sufficiently to warrant Dvorak classifications for the system on September 15. Based on the development of a low-level circulation, it is estimated the system organized into Tropical Depression Eleven-E on September 16 while located around 290 miles (470 km) south of Manzanillo, Mexico. Due to the tropical depression moving over an area of warm water temperatures with favorable upper-level outflow, the NHC anticipated strengthening. The small tropical depression quickly intensified into Tropical Storm Juliette as it moved west-northwestward. The storm organized further with a well-defined rainband drawn into the circulation. The storm quickly intensified, and subsequent to the development of a small eye, Juliette attained hurricane status on September 18, just 42 hours after developing. The eye became better defined as the hurricane moved to the west-northwest, a motion caused by a weak ridge to its north, and Juliette attained major hurricane status early on September 19. Possibly due to increased northeasterly wind shear from an upper-level trough, Juliette stopped its intensification trend, though as it turned to the west it again re-organized. On September 20, while located 420 miles (680 km) southwest of Cabo San Lucas, Juliette attained a peak strength of 150 mph (240 km/h), the strongest tropical cyclone of the season and a Category 4 on the Saffir-Simpson Hurricane Scale.

After maintaining its peak intensity for less than 12 hours, Juliette began to weaken due to an eyewall replacement cycle. After turning to the west-northwest, the winds of the hurricane dropped to 100 mph (160 km/h) by September 22, and the eyewall expanded to about 80 miles (130 km) in diameter. The eyewall contracted to about 40 miles (64 km), and as a result Juliette re-strengthened to attain winds of 105 mph (169 km/h). An eastward moving trough of low pressure turned the hurricane to the north-northeast into an area of cooler water temperatures and increased wind shear. Juliette quickly weakened to a tropical storm late on September 24. The eastward moving trough moved past the storm, resulting in the motion of Juliette turning to a southeast drift. The convection waned and disappeared on September 25, and on September 26 Juliette dissipated while located 450 miles (720 km) west of the southern tip of the Baja California Peninsula.

When the motion of Juliette turned to the northeast, some computer models predicted it would strike Baja California Sur. The government of Mexico issued a tropical storm watch as a precautionary measure for portions of the state. In southern California, the hurricane produced high waves that created dangerous surfing conditions. These waves wiped out a fishing derby. The remnants of Juliette moved into New Mexico and western Texas, producing scattered showers and thunderstorms.

=== Other system ===
- According to the Joint Typhoon Warning Center (JTWC), on January 4 a tropical depression formed east of the International Dateline on January 4, and three days later it exited CPHC's area of responsibility.
- According to the JTWC and Japan Meteorological Agency, on November 10 a tropical depression formed east of the International Dateline on November 10, and soon it exited CPHC's area of responsibility.

== Storm names ==
The following list of names was used for named storms that formed in the North Pacific Ocean east of 140°W in 1995. This is the same list used for the 1989 season, except for Wallis, which had been interchanged with Winnie, and Dalila, a respelling of "Dalilia" (as used previously). The name Dalila was used for the first time in 1995.

- Adolph
- Barbara *
- Cosme
- Dalila
- Erick
- Flossie
- Gil
- Henriette
- Ismael
- Juliette
- Kiko (unused)
- Lorena (unused)
- Manuel (unused)
- Narda (unused)
- Octave (unused)
- Priscilla (unused)
- Raymond (unused)
- Sonia (unused)
- Tico (unused)
- Velma (unused)
- Wallis (unused)
- Xina (unused)
- York (unused)
- Zelda (unused)

For storms that form in the North Pacific from 140°W to the International Date Line, the names come from a series of four rotating lists. Names are used one after the other without regard to year, and when the bottom of one list is reached, the next named storm receives the name at the top of the next list. No named storms formed in the central North Pacific in 2001. Named storms in the table above that crossed into the area during the year are noted (*).

=== Retirement ===
The World Meteorological Organization retired the name Ismael in the spring of 1996 from future use in the Eastern Pacific. Originally slated to be replaced with Israel, it was ultimately replaced with Ivo during the 2001 season.

== Season effects ==
This is a table of all of the tropical cyclones that formed in the 1995 Pacific hurricane season. It includes their name, duration, peak classification and intensities, areas affected, damage, and death totals. Deaths in parentheses are additional and indirect (an example of an indirect death would be a traffic accident), but were still related to that storm. Damage and deaths include totals while the storm was extratropical, a wave, or a low, and all of the damage figures are in 1995 USD.

Saffir–Simpson scale
| TD | TS | C1 | C2 | C3 | C4 | C5 |

1995 Pacific tropical cyclone season statistics
| Storm name | Dates active | Storm category at peak intensity | Max 1-min wind mph (km/h) | Min. press. (mbar) | Areas affected | Damage (US$) | Deaths | Ref(s). |
|---|---|---|---|---|---|---|---|---|
| One-E | May 21 – 23 | Tropical depression | 35 (55) | 1005 | None | None | None | |
| Adolph | June 15 – 21 | Category 4 hurricane | 130 (215) | 948 | None | None | None | |
| Barbara | July 7 – 18 | Category 4 hurricane | 140 (220) | 940 | None | None | None | |
| Cosme | July 17 – 22 | Category 1 hurricane | 75 (120) | 985 | None | None | None | |
| Dalila | July 24 – August 2 | Tropical storm | 65 (100) | 994 | None | None | None | |
| Erick | August 1 – 8 | Tropical storm | 65 (100) | 994 | None | None | None | |
| Flossie | August 7 – 14 | Category 1 hurricane | 80 (130) | 978 | Baja California Peninsula | $5 million | 8 | |
| Gil | August 18 – 27 | Tropical storm | 65 (100) | 993 | Southwestern Mexico | Minimal | None | |
| Henriette | September 1 – 8 | Category 2 hurricane | 100 (155) | 970 | Northern Mexico, Baja California Peninsula | Minimal | None | |
| Ismael | September 12 – 15 | Category 1 hurricane | 80 (130) | 983 | Northern Mexico, Arizona | $26 million | 116 | |
| Juliette | September 16 – 26 | Category 4 hurricane | 150 (240) | 930 | Baja California Peninsula, California | None | None | |
Season aggregates
| 11 systems | May 21 – September 26 | | 150 (240) | 930 | | $31 million | 124 | |

== See also ==
- List of Pacific hurricanes
- Pacific hurricane season
- 1995 Atlantic hurricane season
- 1995 Pacific typhoon season
- 1995 North Indian Ocean cyclone season
- South-West Indian Ocean cyclone season: 1994–95, 1995–96
- Australian region cyclone seasons: 1994–95, 1995–96
- South Pacific cyclone seasons: 1994–95, 1995–96
