= Cabo Corrientes, Jalisco =

Cape in Jalisco, Mexico

Cabo Corrientes
- Cape
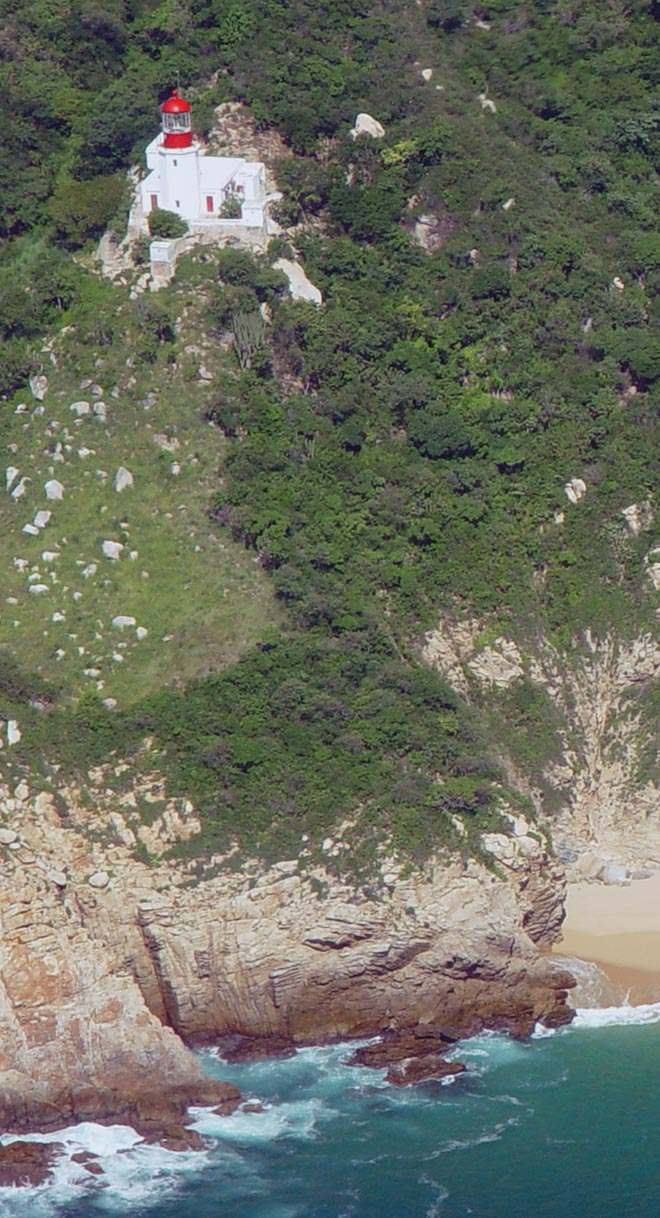
- Lighthouse--Cabo-Corrientes

- Location within Jalisco Location within Mexico
- Coordinates: 20°24′32″N 105°41′40″W

Cabo Corrientes is a cape on the Pacific coast of the Mexican state of Jalisco. It marks the southernmost point of the Bahía de Banderas (Bay of Flags), upon which the port and resort city of Puerto Vallarta stands. The municipality in which the cape lies is also called Cabo Corrientes.

Cabo Corrientes is a prominent navigational landmark, featured on the earliest cartography of the region. Cruising sailors often refer to it as Mexico's Point Conception.

== Notes ==
1. "Cruiser Lost on the Gold Coast of Mexico".
2. "Slackers in Paradise: Heading North".
