= 1950 Pacific typhoon season =

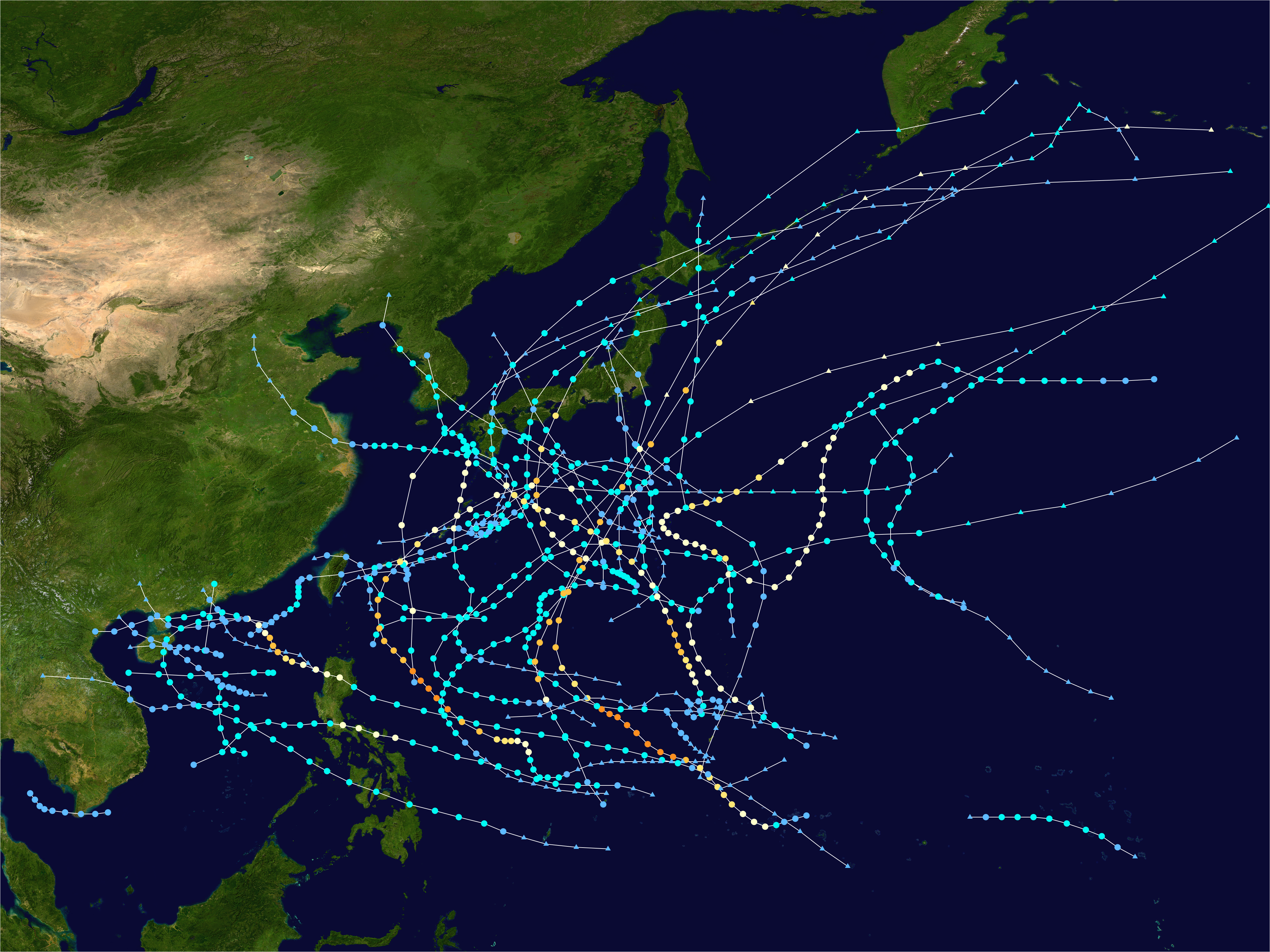
- Season summary map

Seasonal boundaries
- First system formed: April 12, 1950
- Last system dissipated: January 1, 1951

Strongest storm
- By maximum sustained winds: Doris
  - Maximum winds: 240 km/h (150 mph) (1-minute sustained)
  - Lowest pressure: 922 hPa (mbar)
- By central pressure: Clara
  - Maximum winds: 230 km/h (145 mph) (1-minute sustained)
  - Lowest pressure: 899 hPa (mbar)

Seasonal statistics
- Total storms: 18
- Typhoons: 12
- Very strong typhoons: 1 (unofficial)
- Total fatalities: 544 total
- Total damage: Unknown

Related articles
- 1950 Atlantic hurricane season; 1950 Pacific hurricane season; 1950 North Indian Ocean cyclone season

The 1950 Pacific typhoon season has no official bounds; it ran year-round in 1950, but most tropical cyclones tend to form in the northwestern Pacific Ocean between June and December. These dates conventionally delimit the period of each year when most tropical cyclones form in the northwestern Pacific Ocean.

The scope of this article is limited to the Pacific Ocean, north of the equator and west of the International Date Line. Storms that form east of the date line and north of the equator are called hurricanes; see 1950 Pacific hurricane season. This would be the first season that Fleet Weather Center in Guam, predecessor agency to Joint Typhoon Warning Center, would take most of the responsibility in the basin, including naming the storms. Before this season, the storms are identified and named by the United States Armed Services, and these names are taken from the list that USAS publicly adopted before the 1945 season started.

== Systems ==
=== Severe Tropical Storm One ===
- Severe tropical storm (CMA)
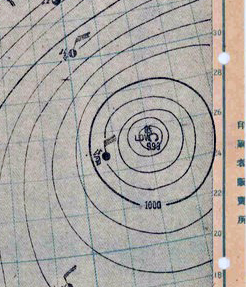
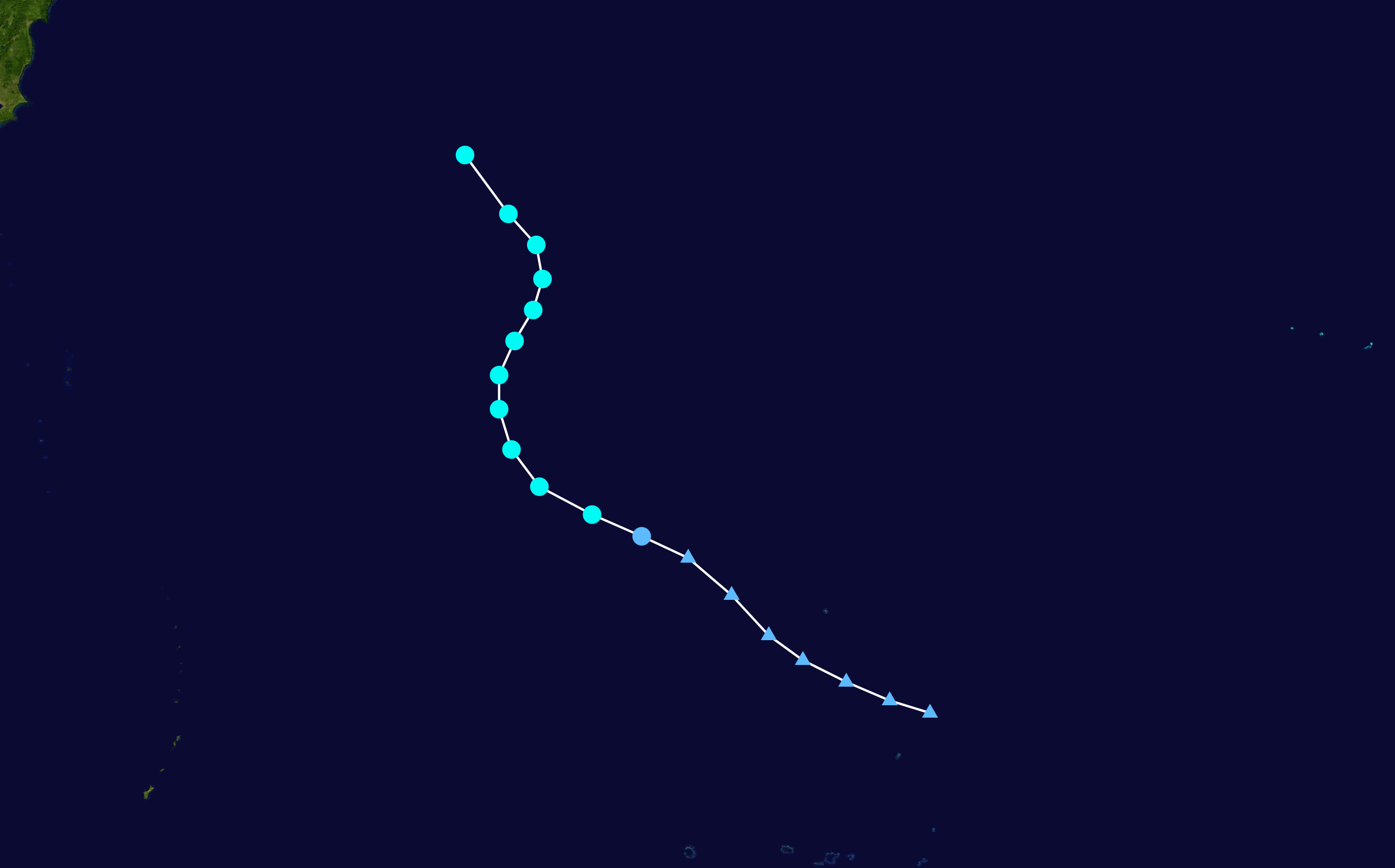
- Duration: April 12 – April 15
- Peak intensity: 110 km/h (70 mph) (10-min); 984 hPa (mbar)

The storm existed from April 12 to April 15 without making landfall.

=== Super Typhoon Doris ===
- Typhoon (JMA)
- Category 4 super typhoon (SSHWS)
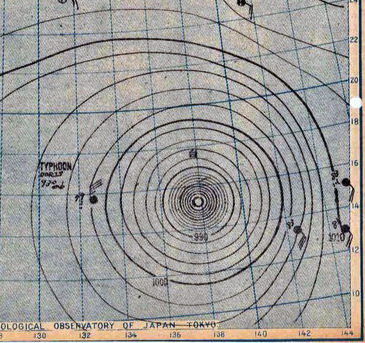
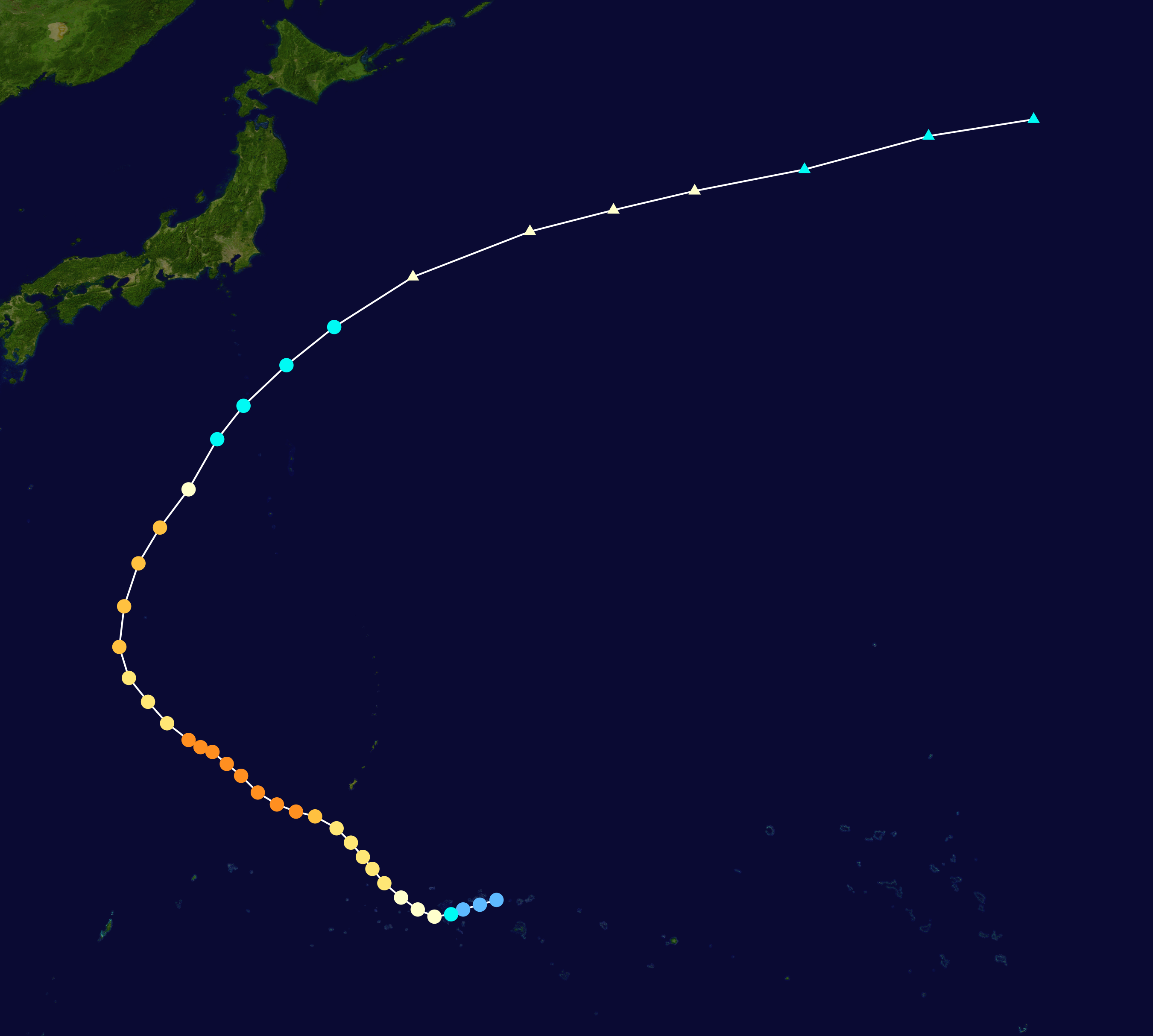
- Duration: May 6 – May 14
- Peak intensity: 240 km/h (150 mph) (1-min); 922 hPa (mbar)

Doris was a Category 4 Super typhoon that remained out to sea at its lifetime. It formed on May 6, peaking as a Category 4 with winds up to 240km/h (150 mph) and with a pressure of 922 mbar and dissipated on May 14.

=== Tropical Storm 02W ===
- Tropical storm (JMA)
- Tropical storm (SSHWS)
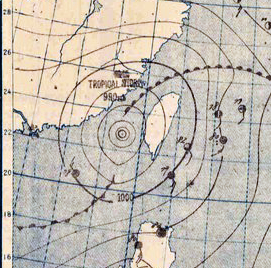
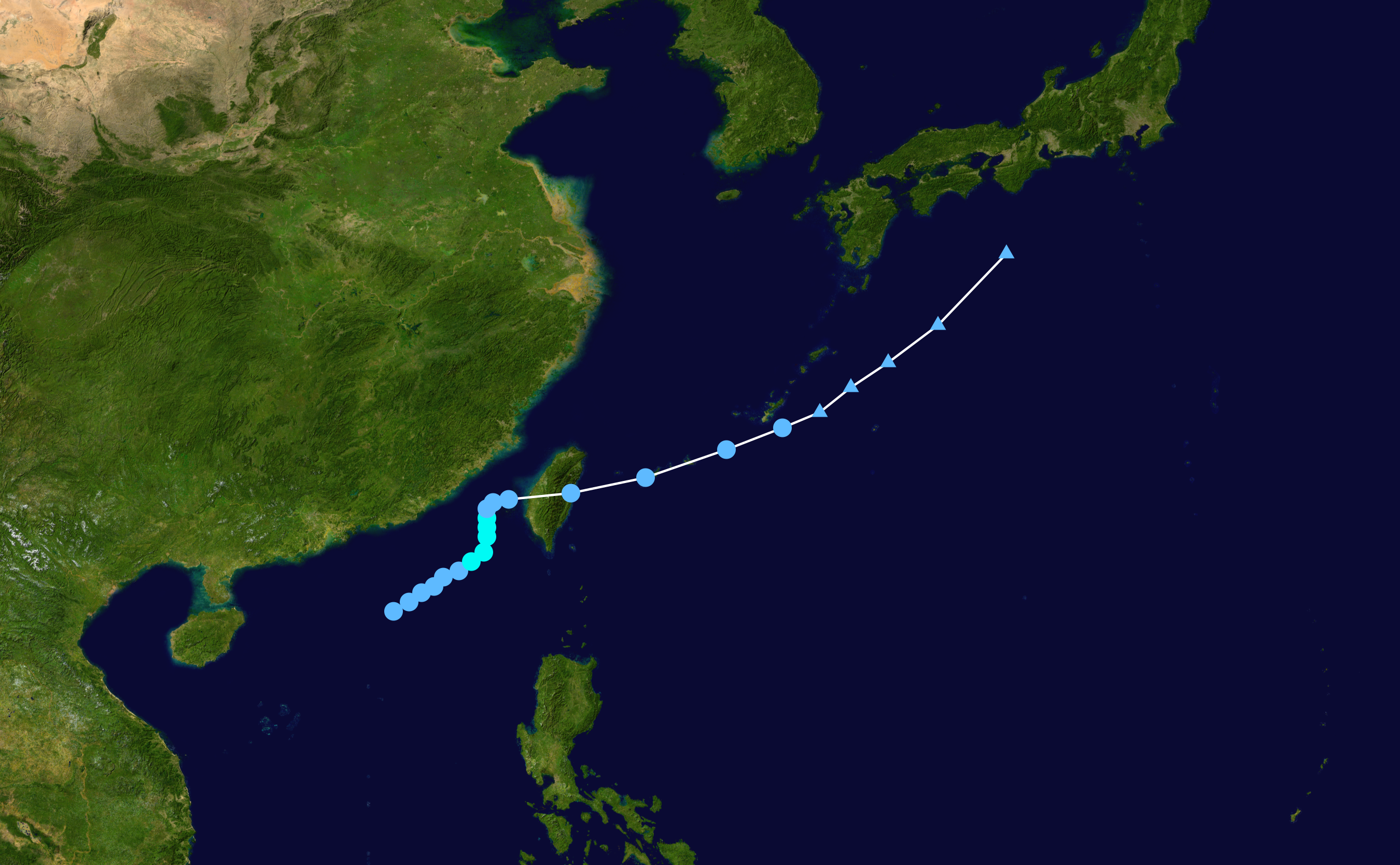
- Duration: June 5 – June 9
- Peak intensity: 65 km/h (40 mph) (1-min); 997 hPa (mbar)

This storm impacted Taiwan as a tropical storm.

=== Typhoon Elsie ===
- Typhoon (JMA)
- Category 1 typhoon (SSHWS)
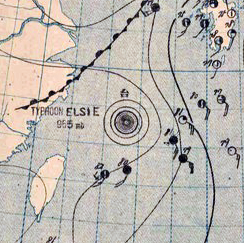
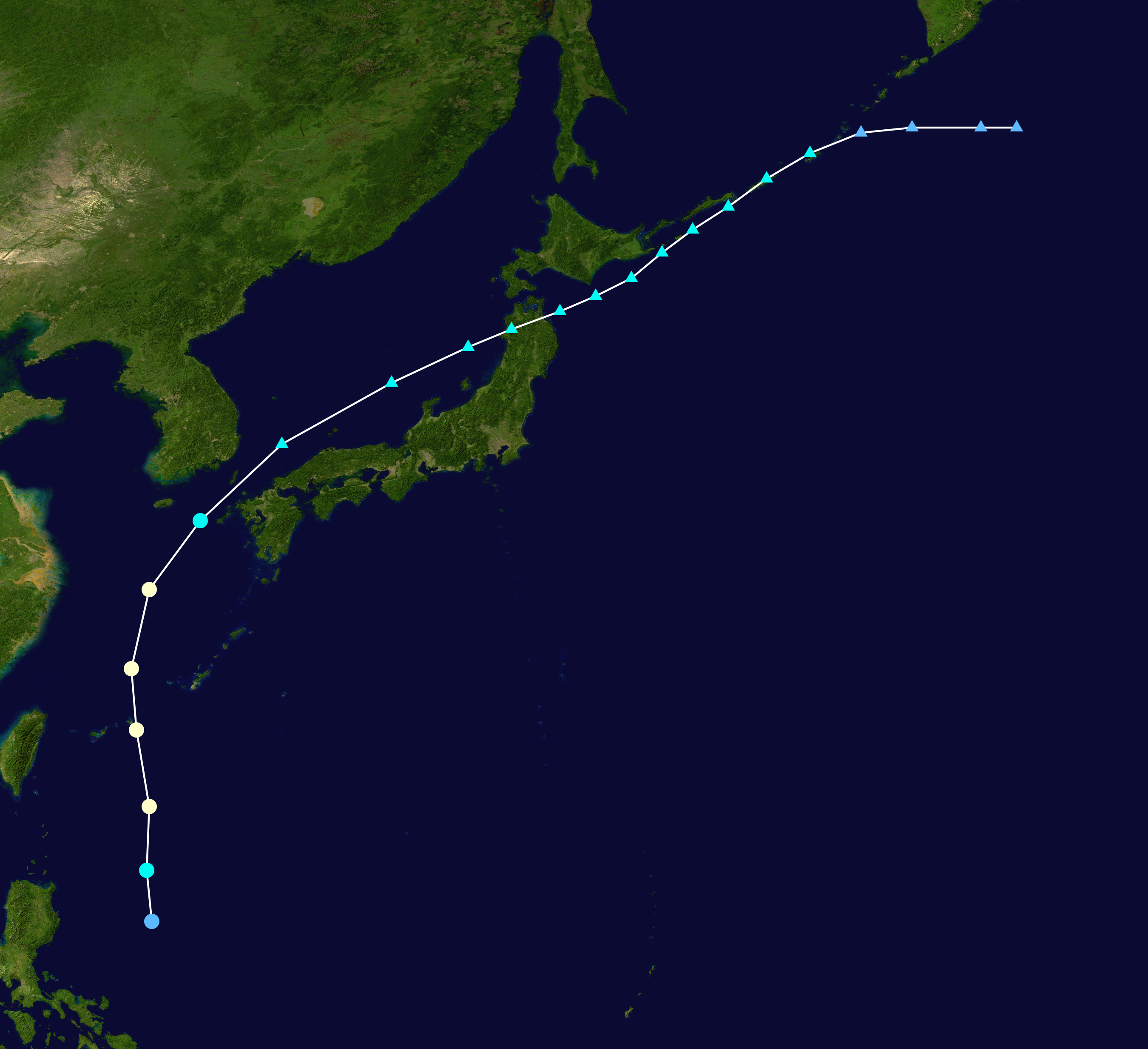
- Duration: June 22 – June 24
- Peak intensity: 140 km/h (85 mph) (1-min); 981 hPa (mbar)

Elsie was a Category 1 typhoon that remained out to sea at its lifetime. It formed on June 22, peaking as a Category 1 with winds up to 140km/h (85 mph) and with a pressure of 981 mbar and dissipated on June 24.

=== CMA Severe Tropical Storm Six ===
- Severe tropical storm (CMA)
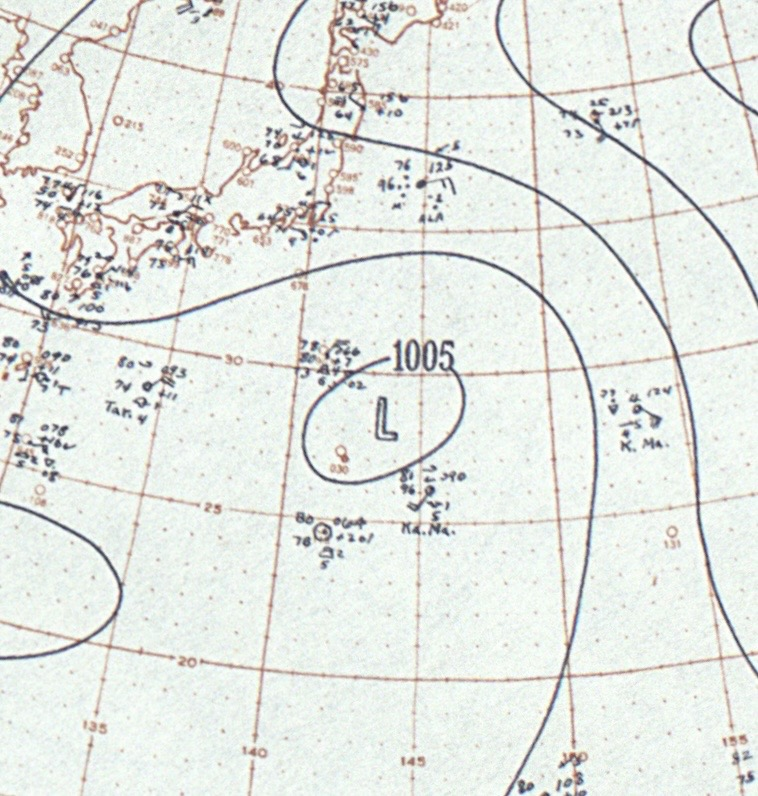
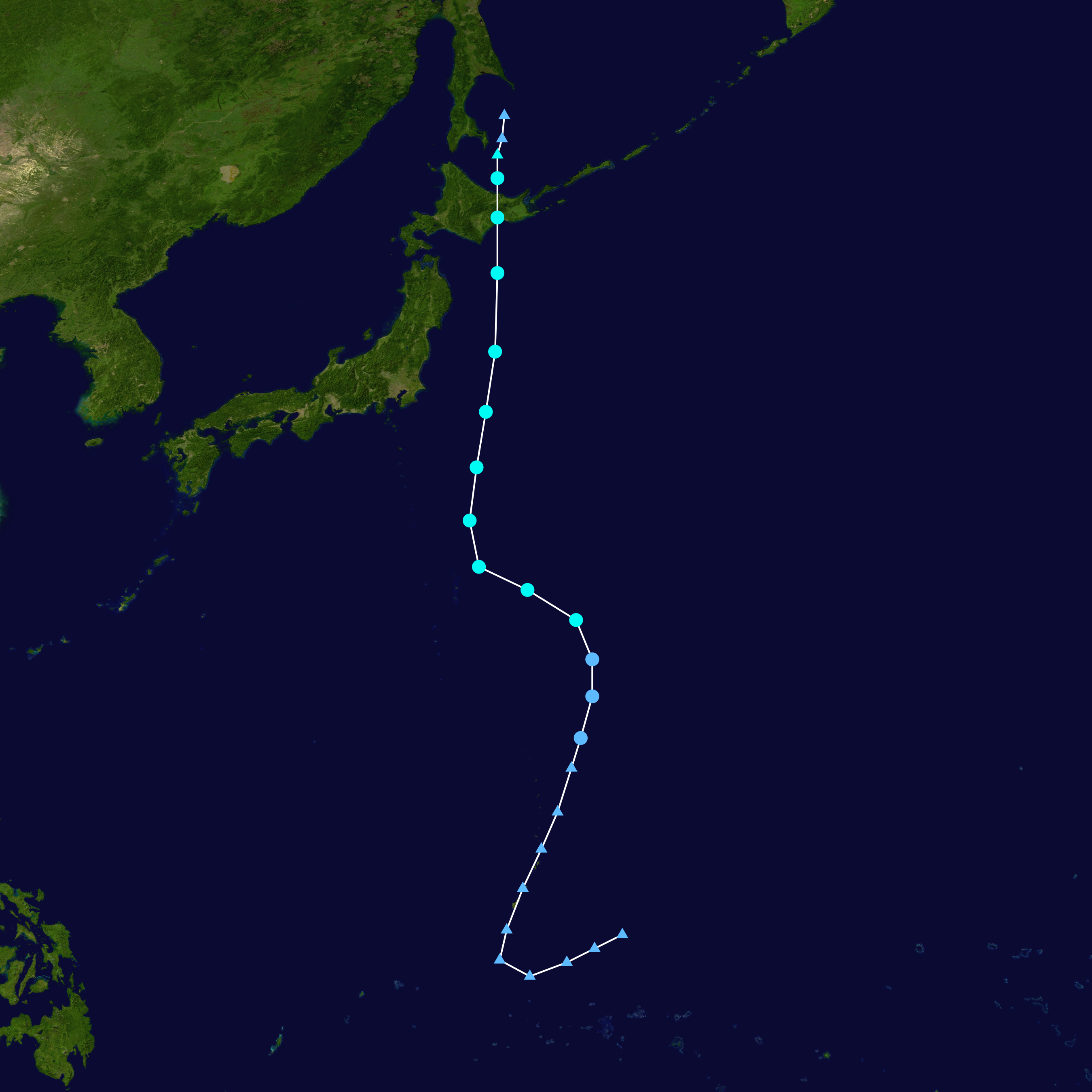
- Duration: July 12 – July 15
- Peak intensity: 95 km/h (60 mph) (10-min); 990 hPa (mbar)

The storm struck Japan as a tropical storm. It was only recorded by CMA.

=== Tropical Storm Flossie ===
- Typhoon (JMA)
- Tropical storm (SSHWS)
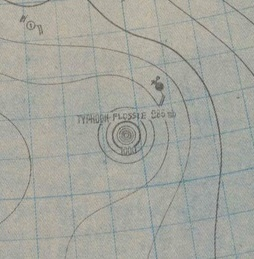
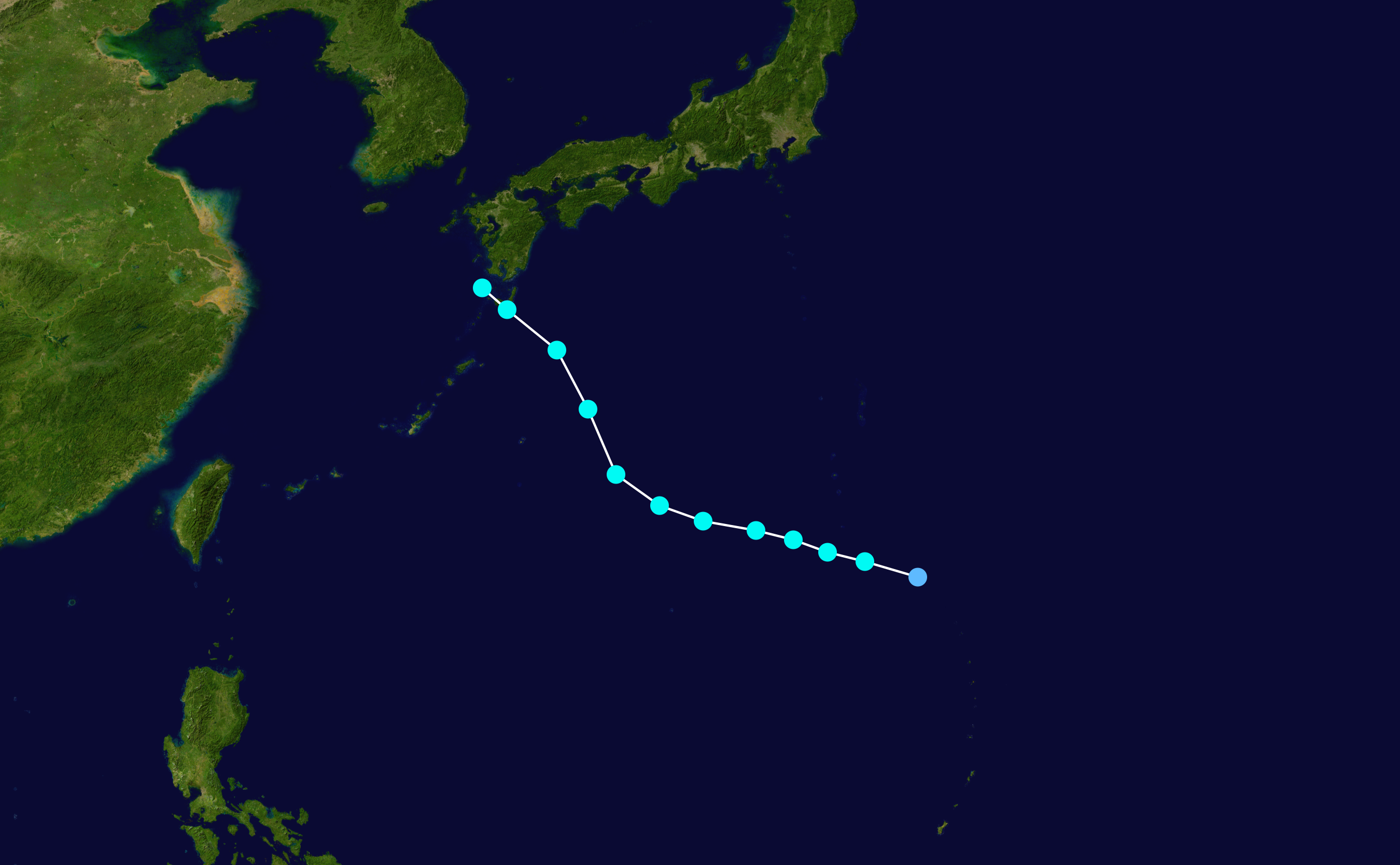
- Duration: July 15 – July 19
- Peak intensity: 110 km/h (70 mph) (1-min); 993 hPa (mbar)

Flossie hit Japan as a tropical storm.

=== Typhoon Grace ===
- Typhoon (JMA)
- Category 1 typhoon (SSHWS)
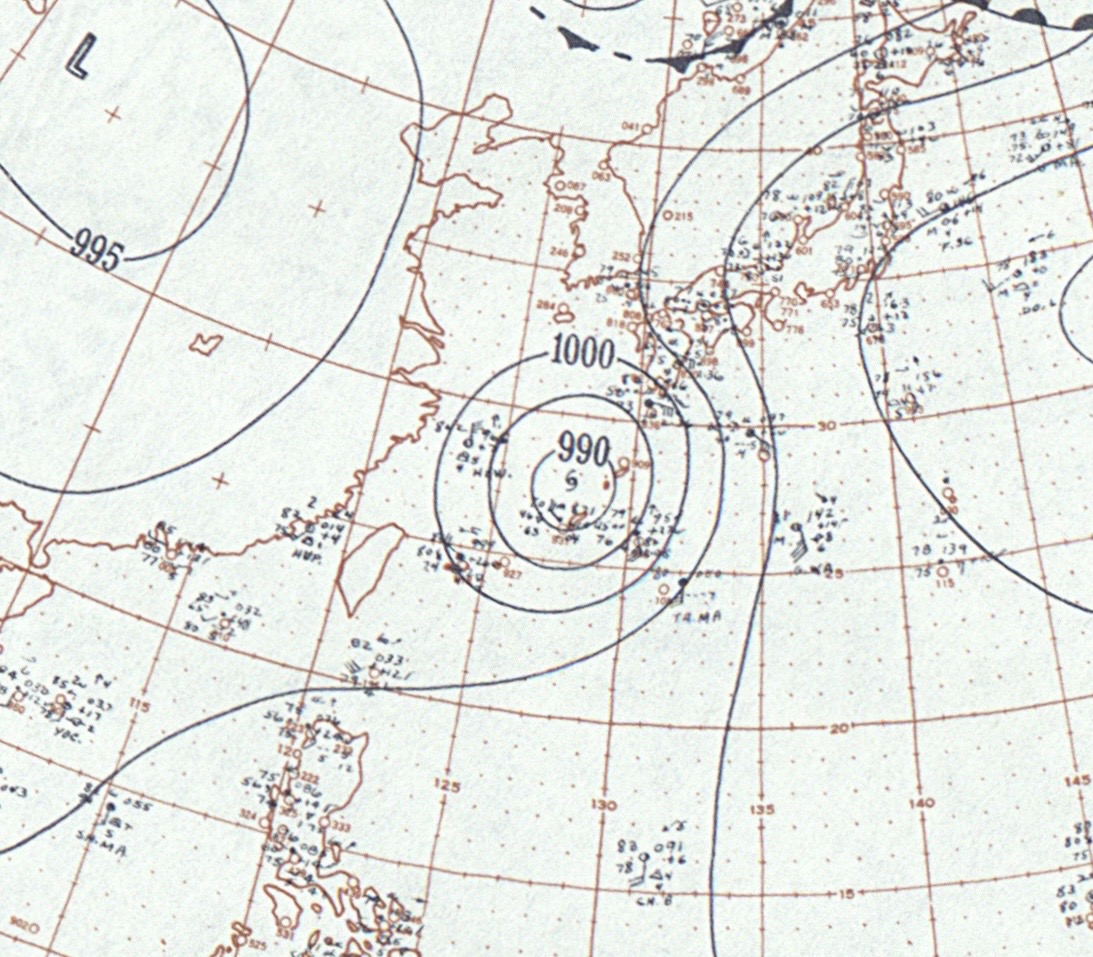
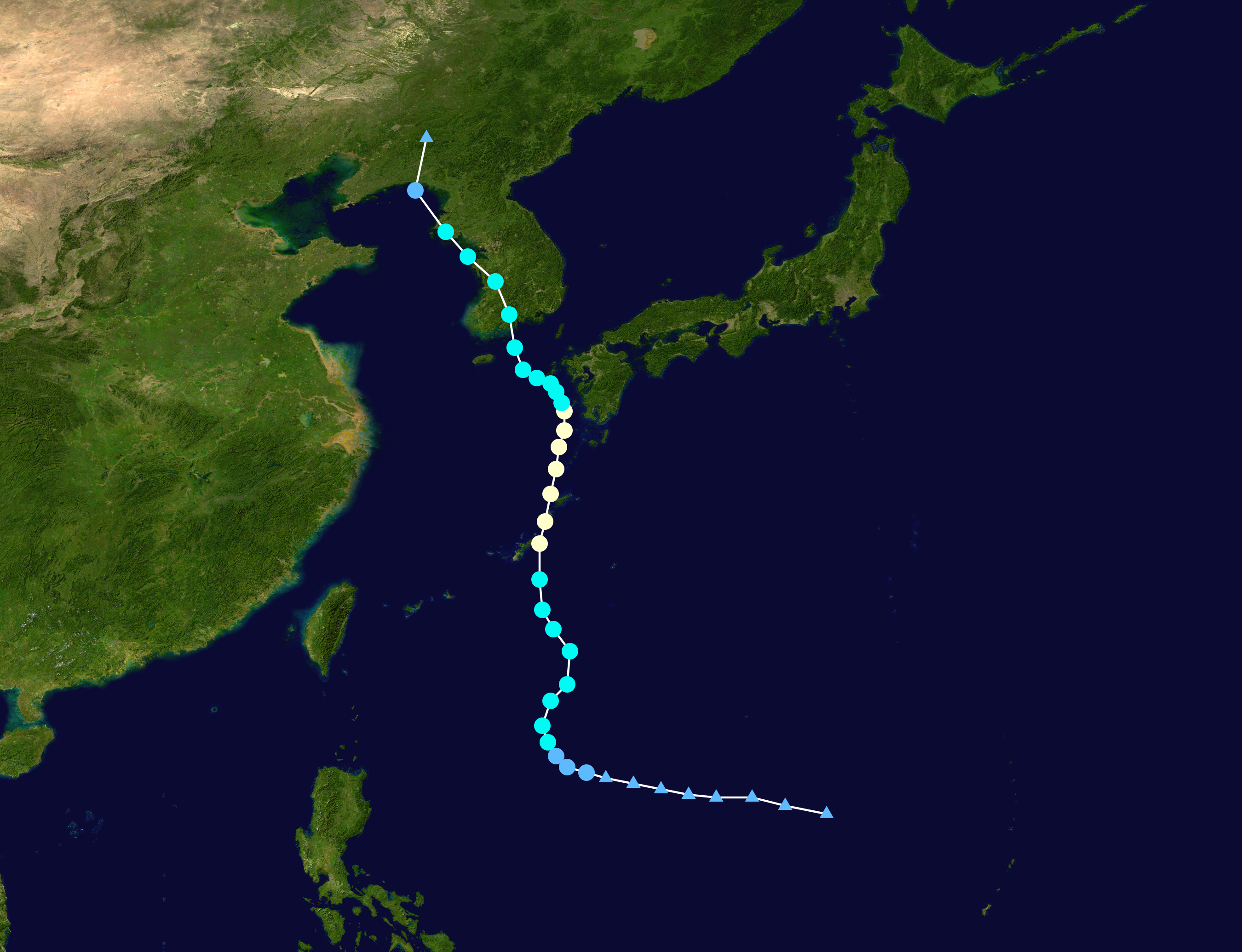
- Duration: July 15 – July 22
- Peak intensity: 130 km/h (80 mph) (1-min); 981 hPa (mbar)

Typhoon Grace impacted Korea and Japan.

=== Tropical Storm Helene ===
- Tropical storm (JMA)
- Tropical storm (SSHWS)
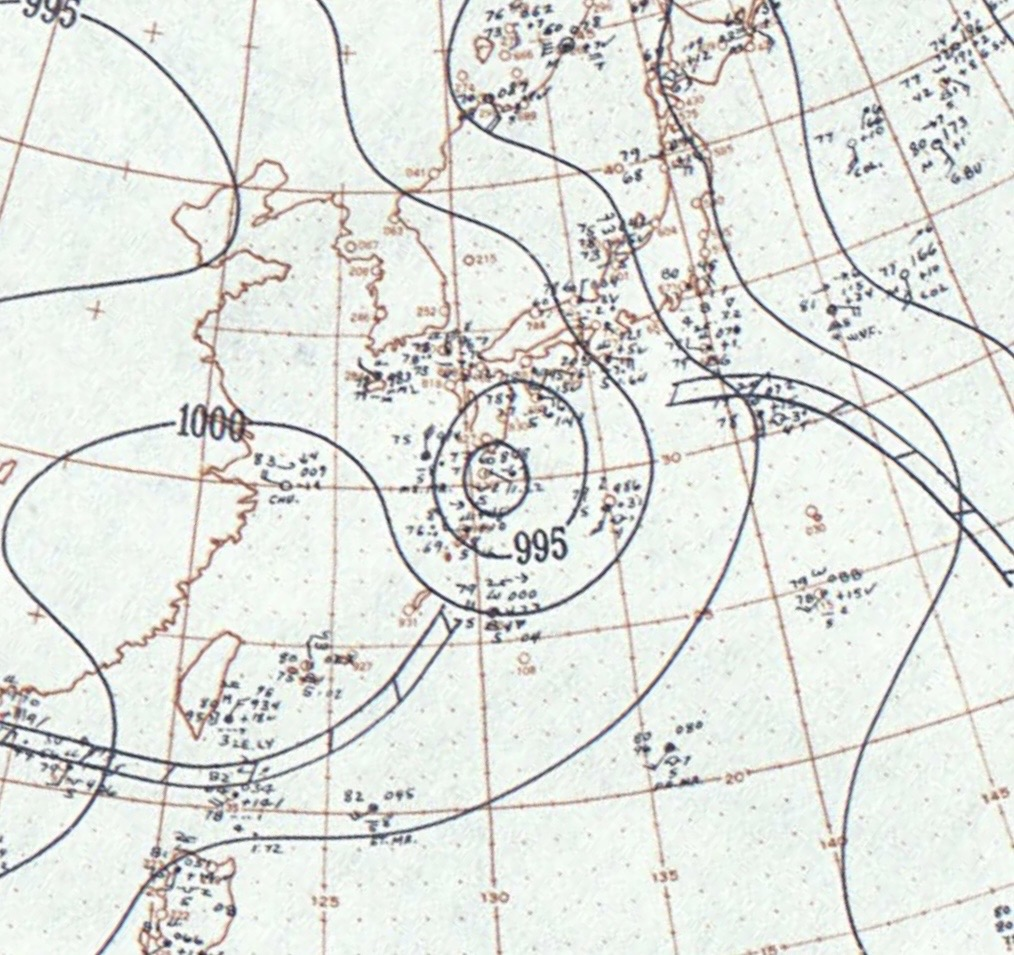
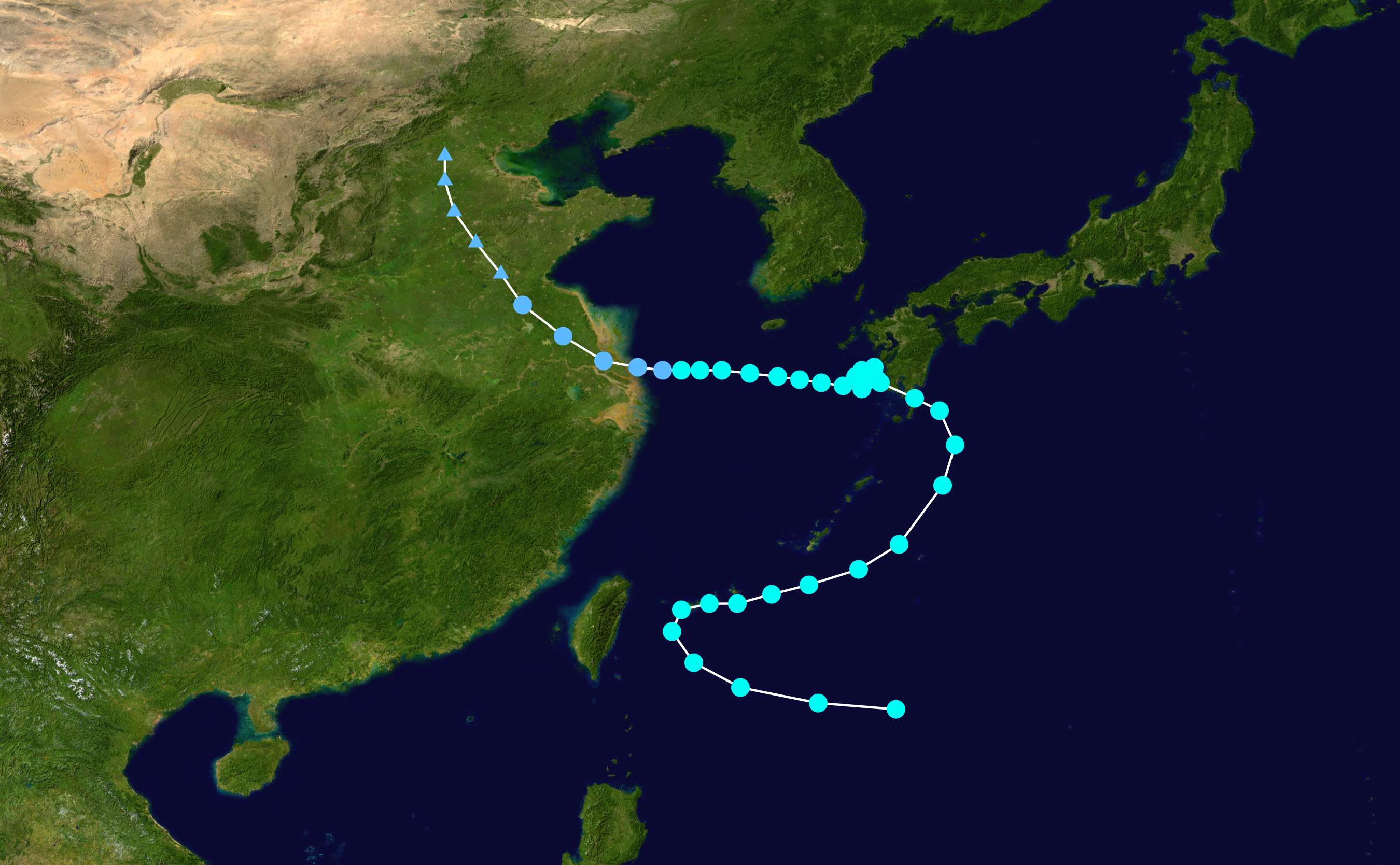
- Duration: July 24 – August 1
- Peak intensity: 95 km/h (60 mph) (1-min); 990 hPa (mbar)

It formed on July 24th, then stalled near Japan. Then raced towards China, Then dissipated on August 1st. Overall, Tropical Storm Helene caused 2 deaths.

=== CMA Tropical Storm Thirteen ===
- Tropical storm (CMA)
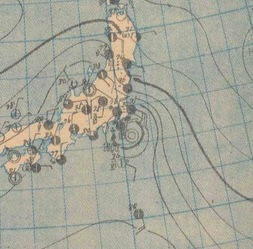
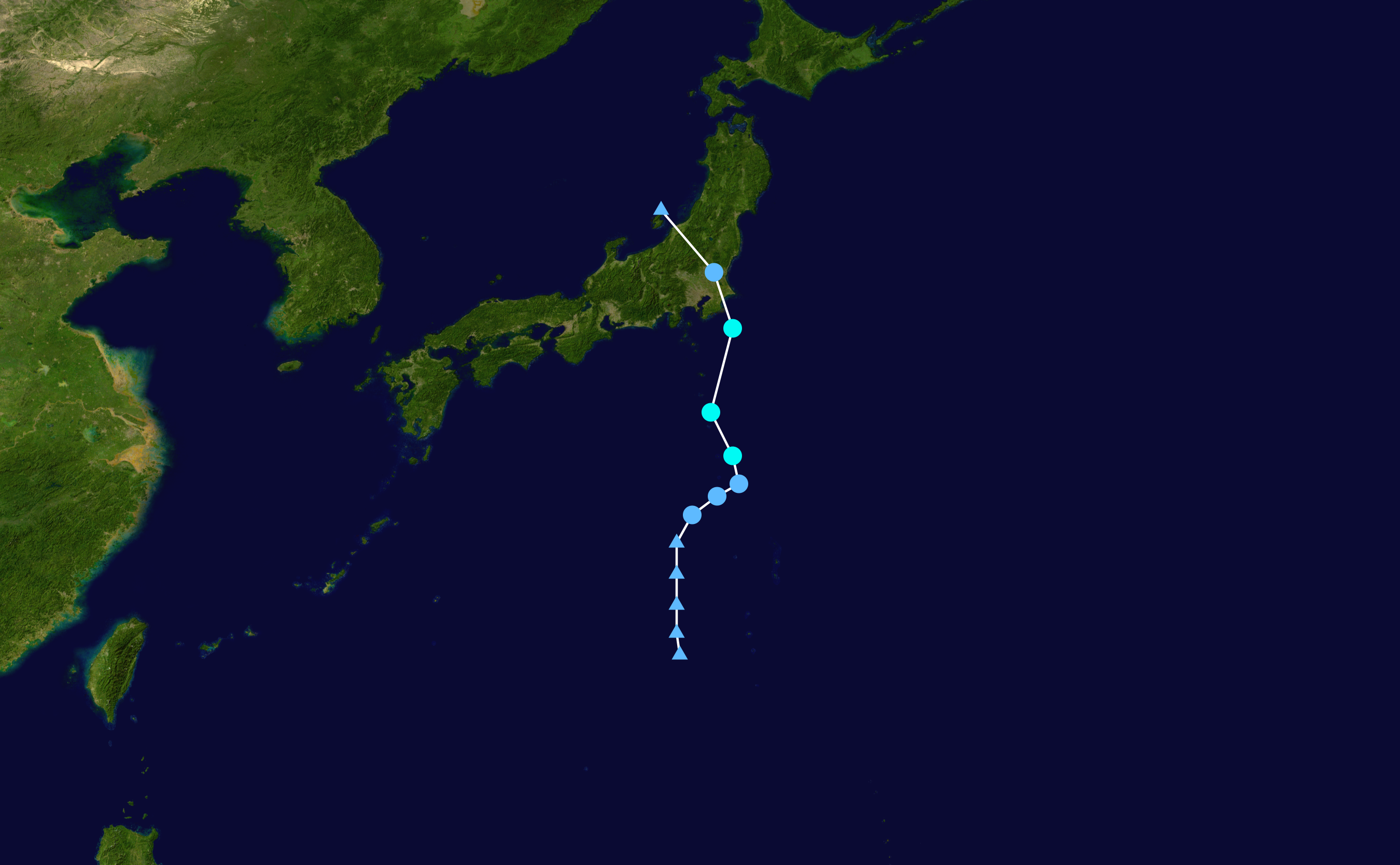
- Duration: August 2 – August 4
- Peak intensity: 75 km/h (45 mph) (10-min); 992 hPa (mbar)

The storm impacted Japan.

=== CMA Tropical Storm Fifteen ===
- Tropical storm (CMA)
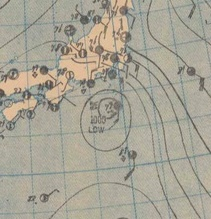
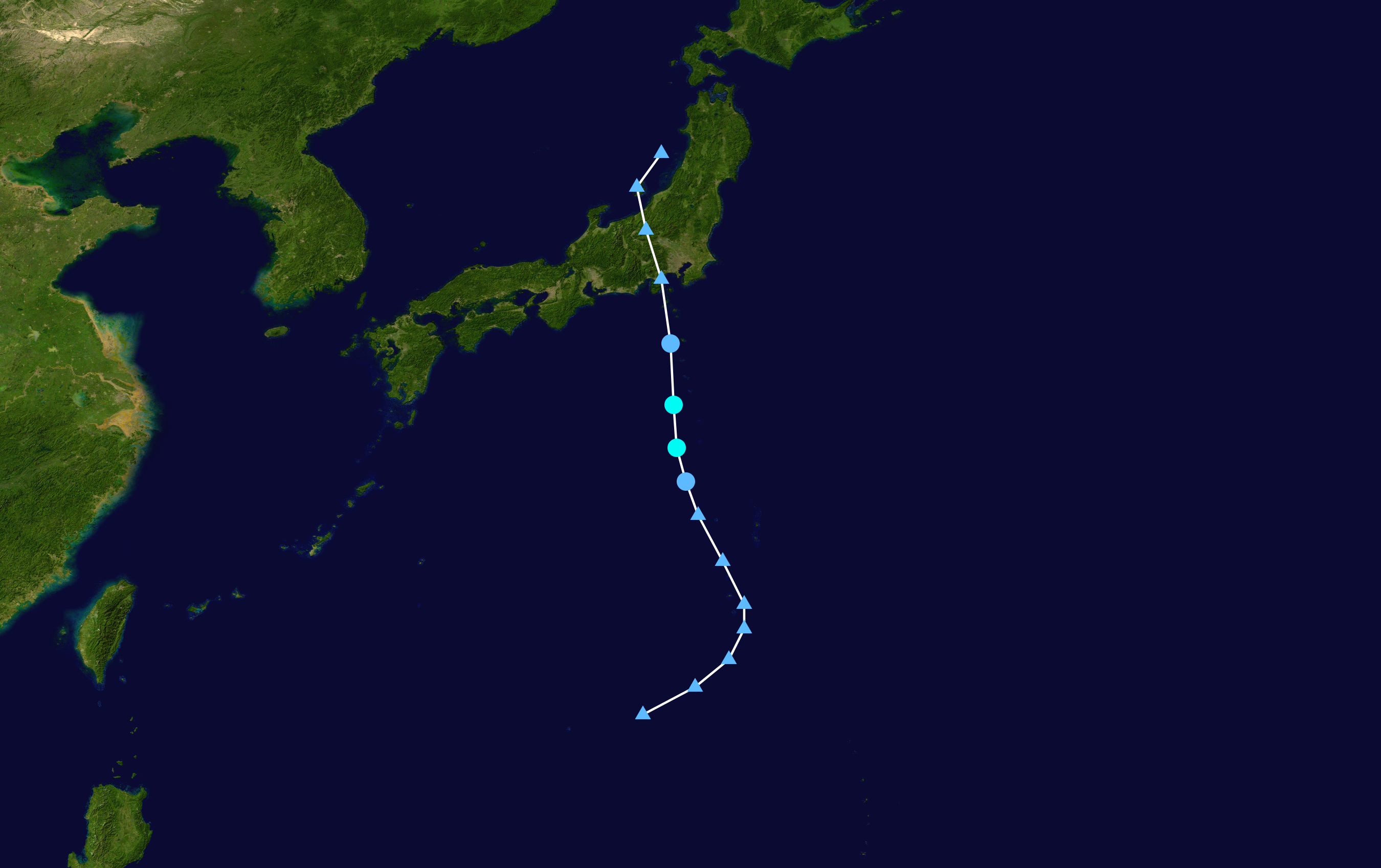
- Duration: August 3 – August 4
- Peak intensity: 75 km/h (45 mph) (10-min); 998 hPa (mbar)

The storm hit Hokkaido, Japan.

=== JMA Tropical Storm Sixteen ===
- Tropical storm (JMA)
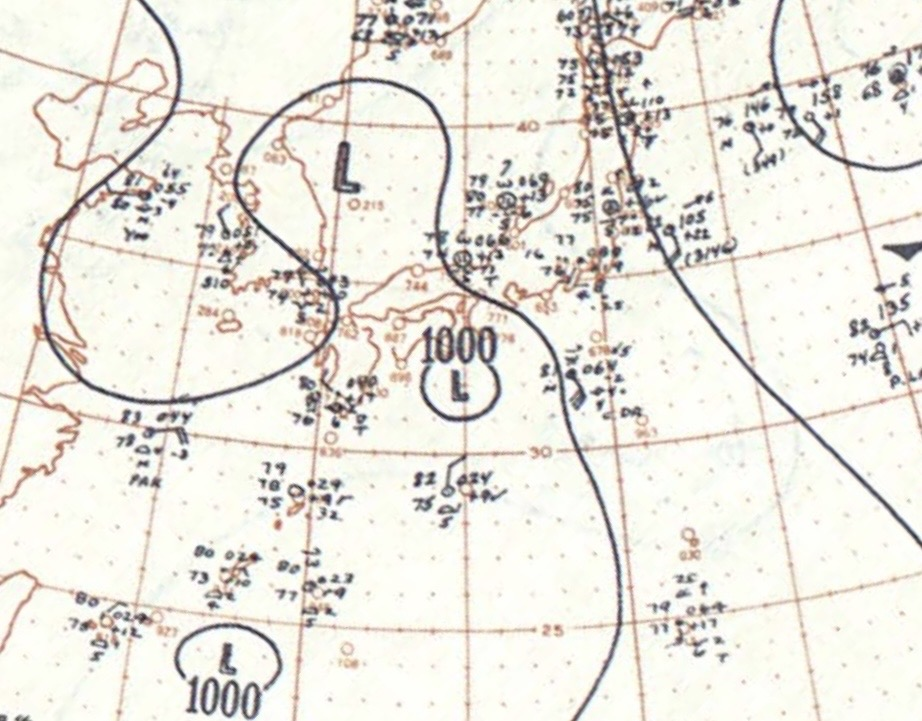
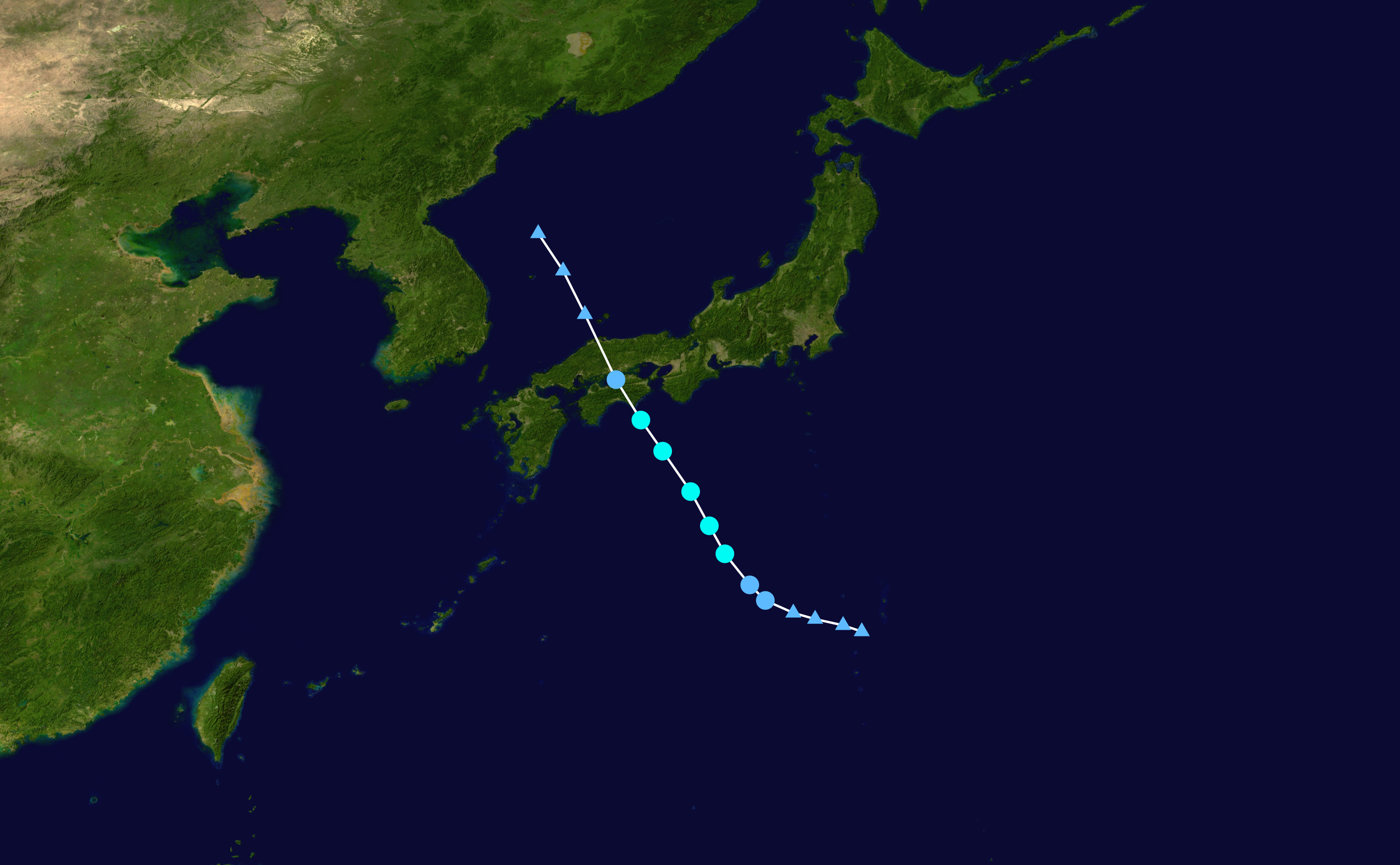
- Duration: August 4 – August 6
- Peak intensity: 75 km/h (45 mph) (10-min); 996 hPa (mbar)

This storm was the third and last storm consecutively to make landfall on Japan.

=== Typhoon Ida ===
- Typhoon (JMA)
- Category 1 typhoon (SSHWS)
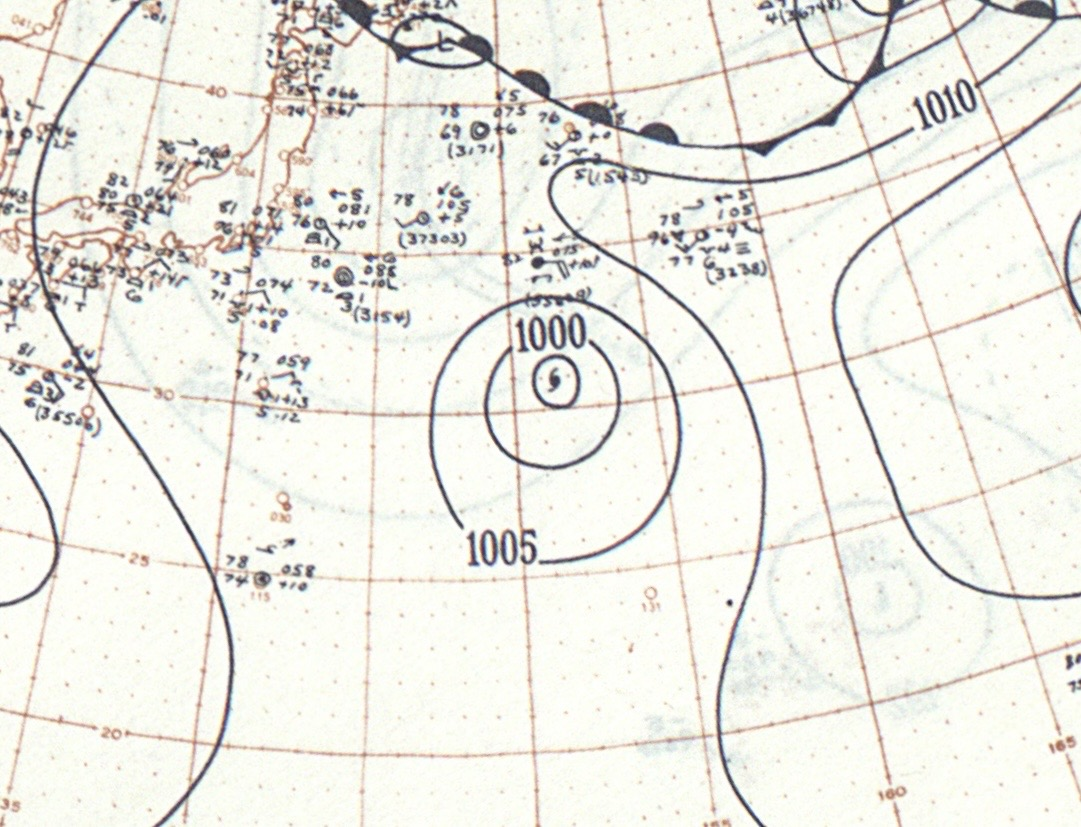
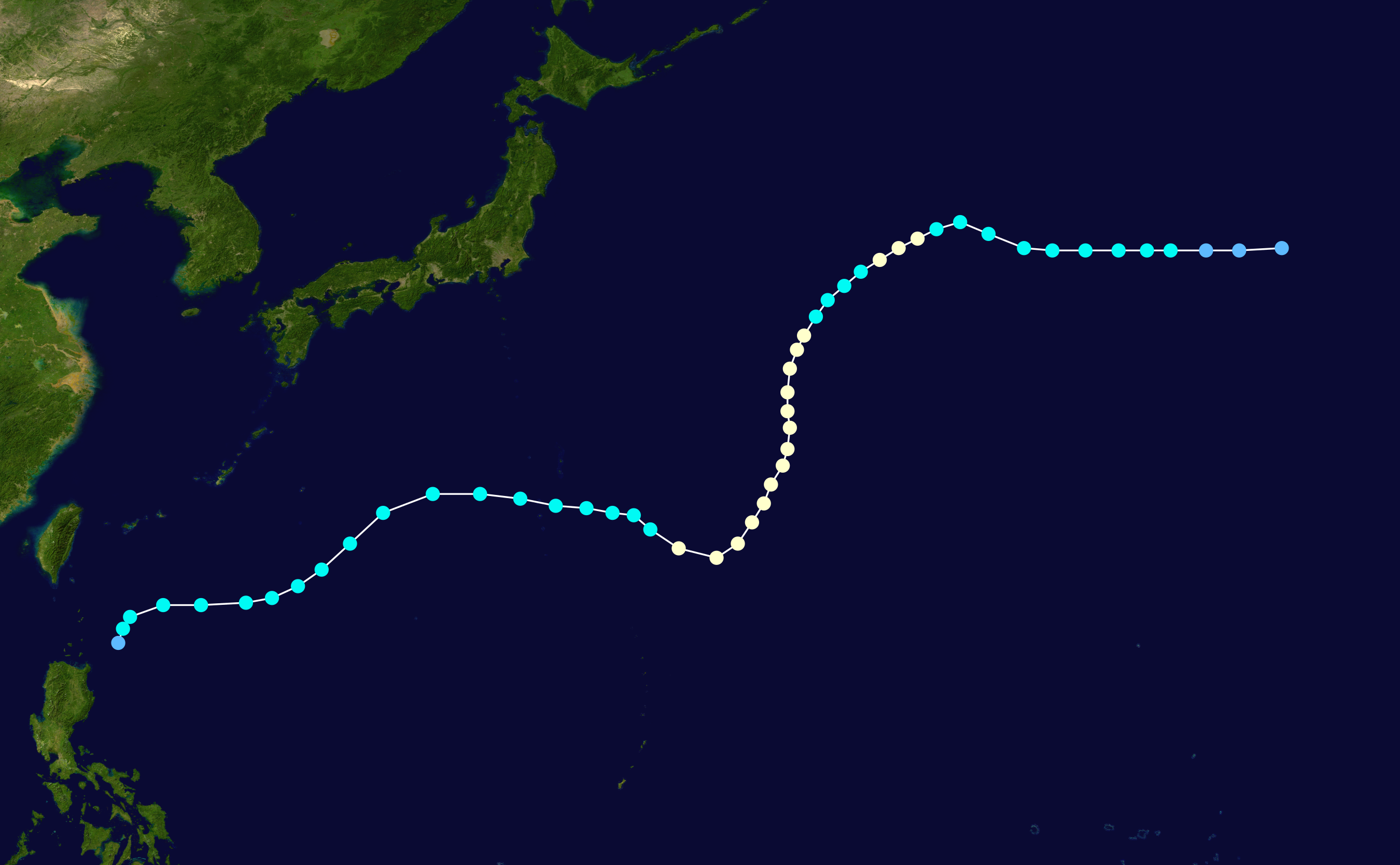
- Duration: August 9 – August 22
- Peak intensity: 140 km/h (85 mph) (1-min); 973 hPa (mbar)

Ida was a Category 1 typhoon that remained out to sea.

=== JMA Severe Tropical Storm Twenty ===
- Severe tropical storm (JMA)
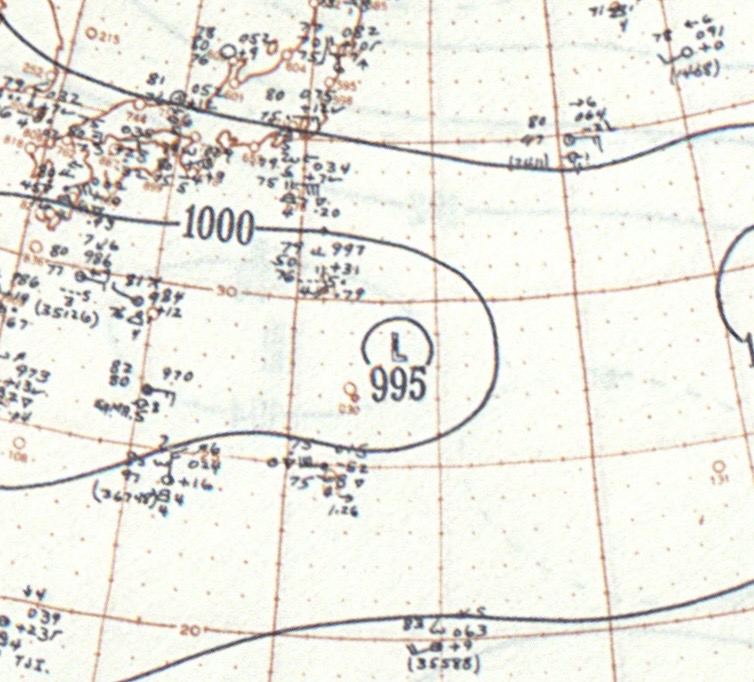
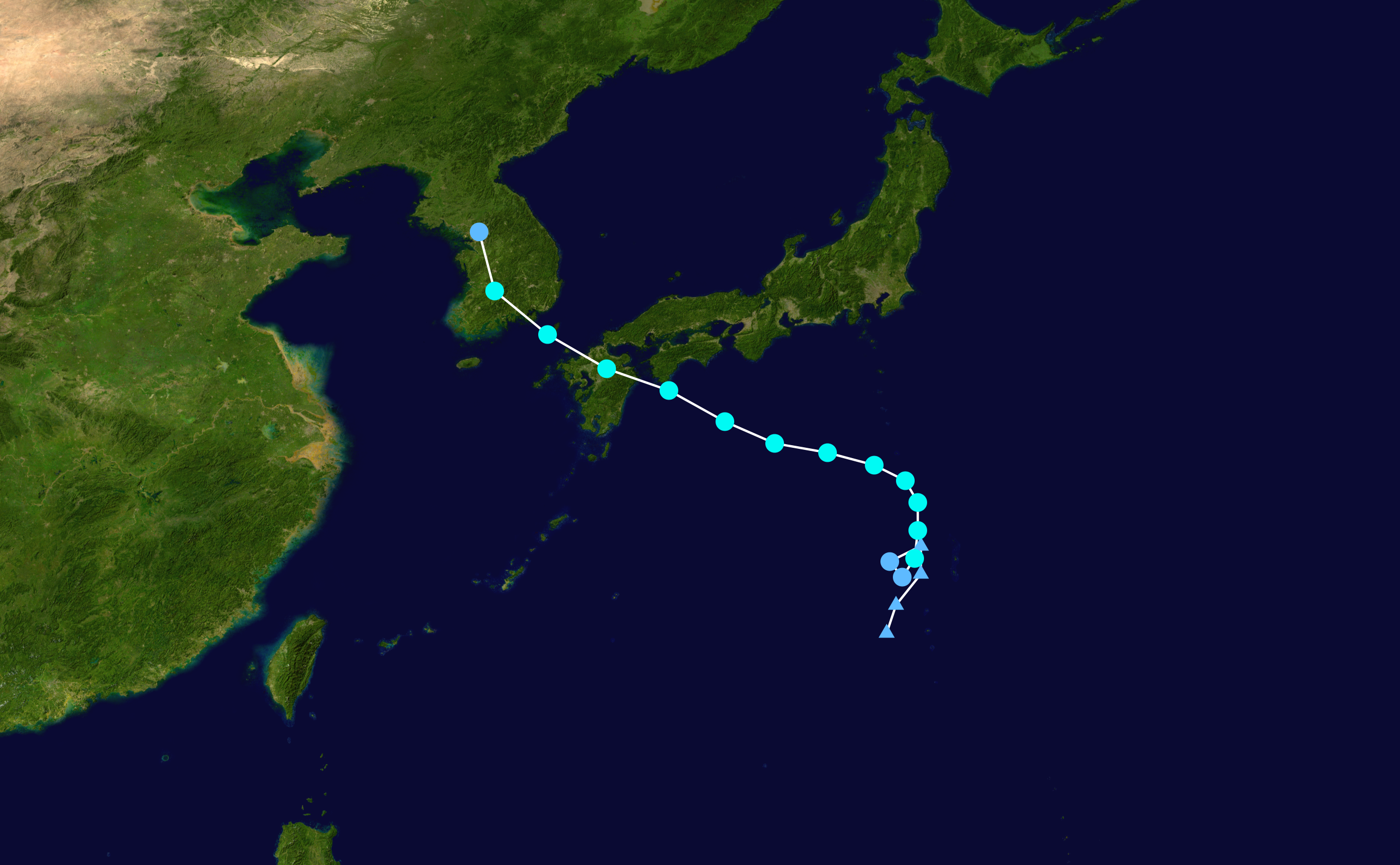
- Duration: August 10 – August 14
- Peak intensity: 95 km/h (60 mph) (10-min); 990 hPa (mbar)

This storm impacted Japan and South Korea. This storm also occurred in the Korean War, where Korean soldiers were battling in South Korea during the storm's impact on land.

=== CMA Tropical Storm Twenty-one ===
- Severe tropical storm (CMA)
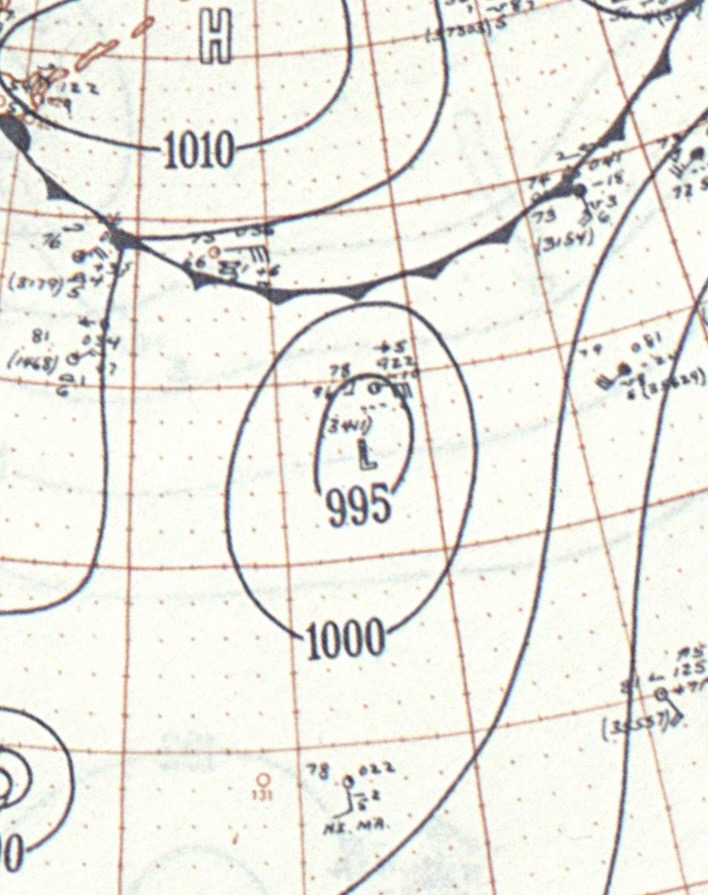
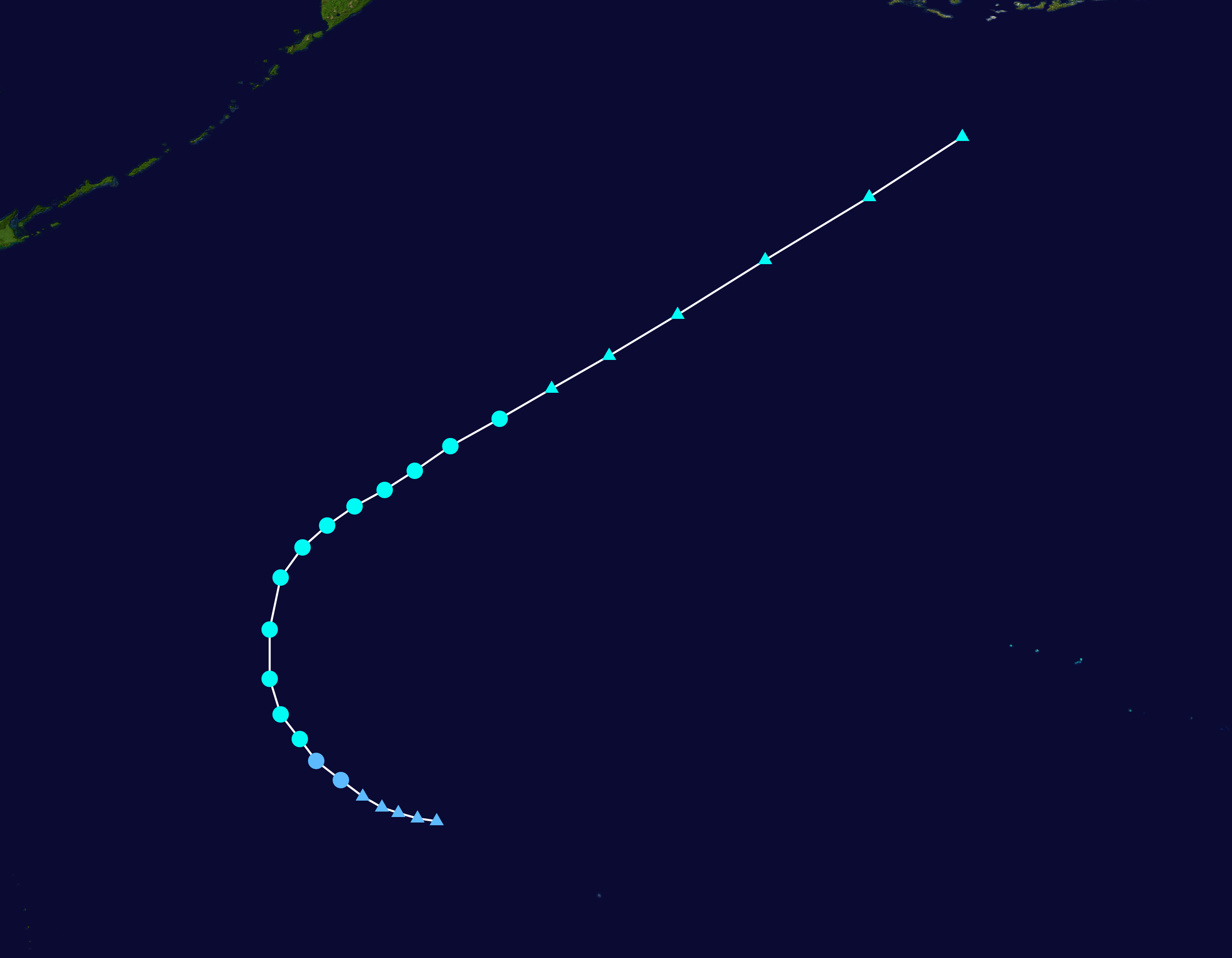
- Duration: August 11 – August 14
- Peak intensity: 110 km/h (70 mph) (10-min); 980 hPa (mbar)

Severe Tropical Storm Twenty-one was a severe tropical storm that remained in open waters.

=== Severe Tropical Storm Twenty-three ===
- Severe tropical storm
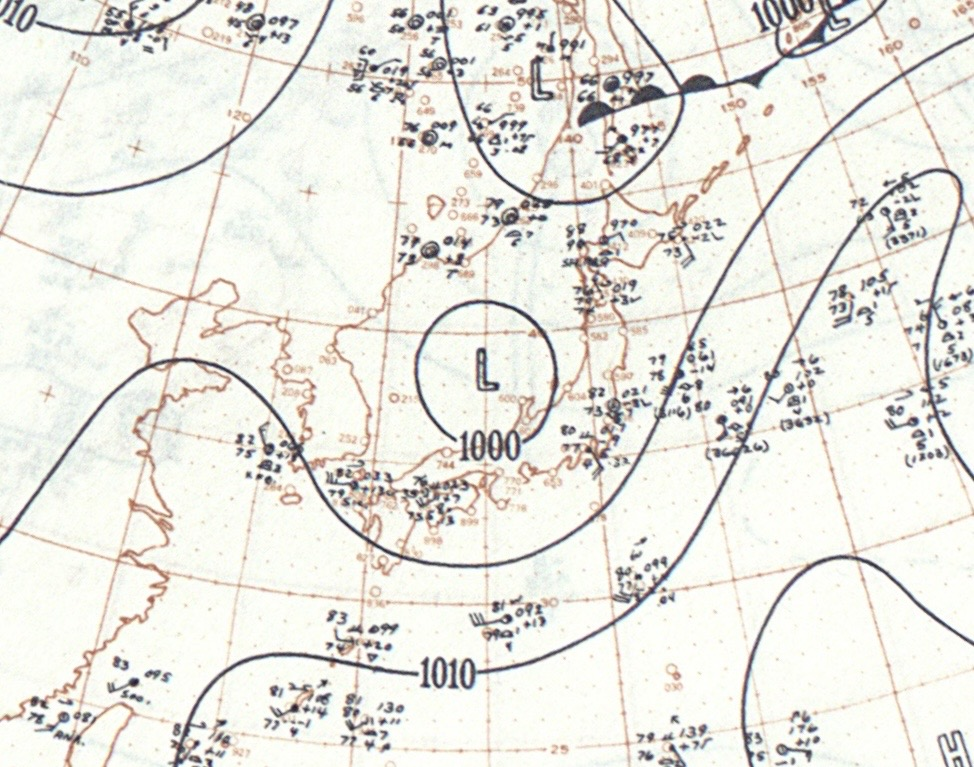
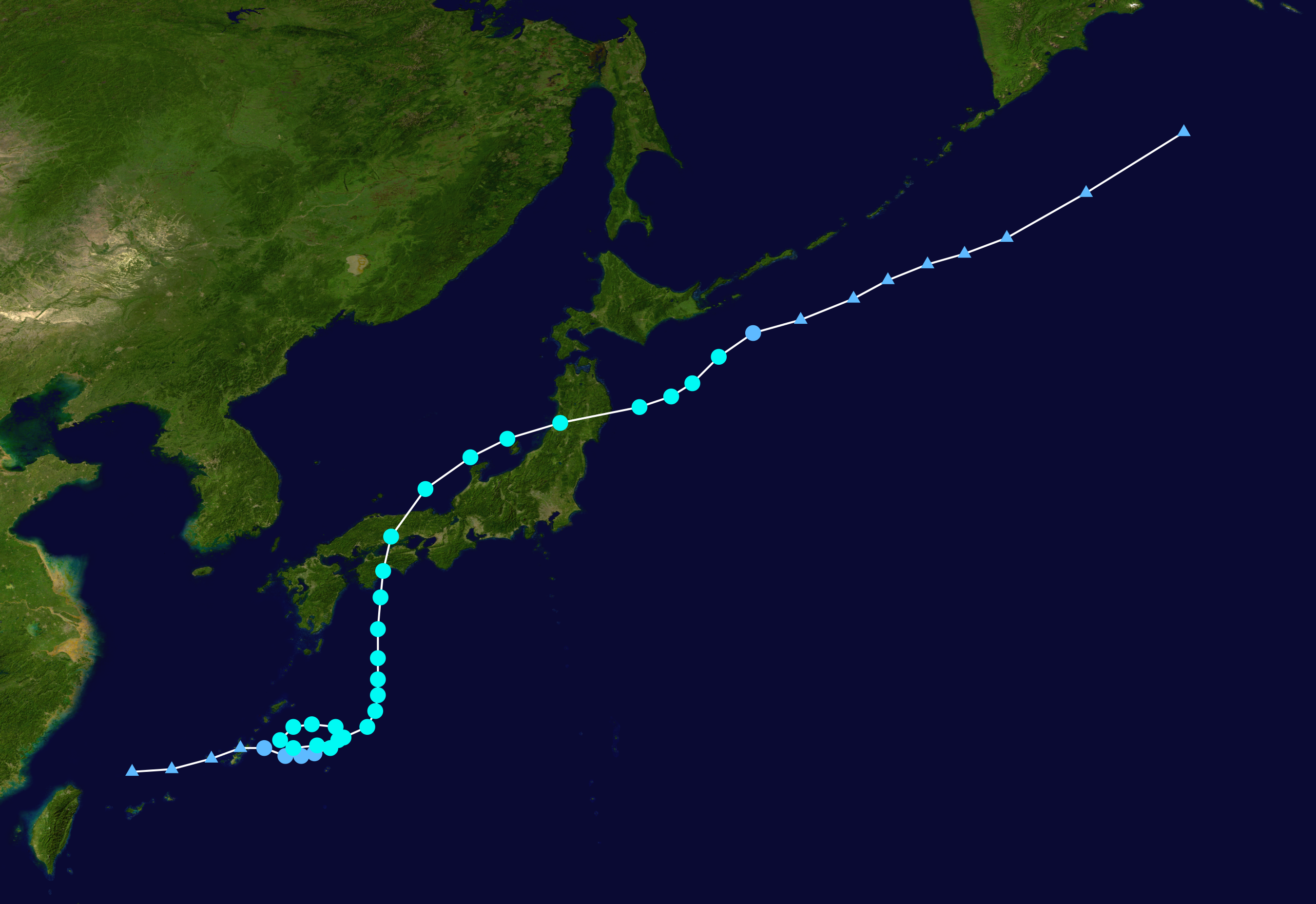
- Duration: August 14 – August 22
- Peak intensity: 110 km/h (70 mph) (10-min); 990 hPa (mbar)

Severe Tropical Storm Twenty-Three tracked through Japan.

=== Typhoon Jane ===
- Typhoon (JMA)
- Category 3 typhoon (SSHWS)
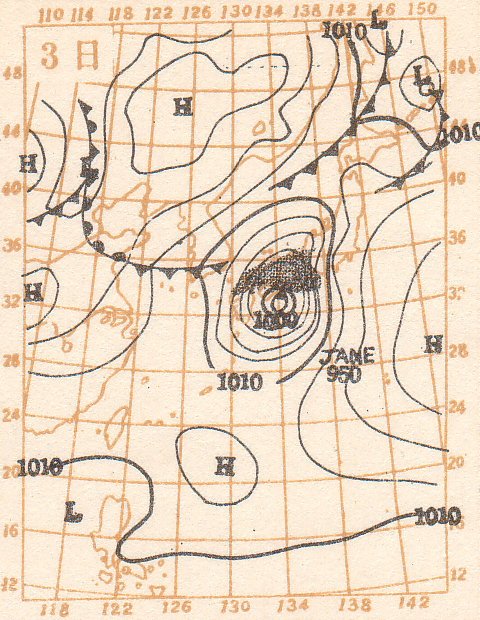
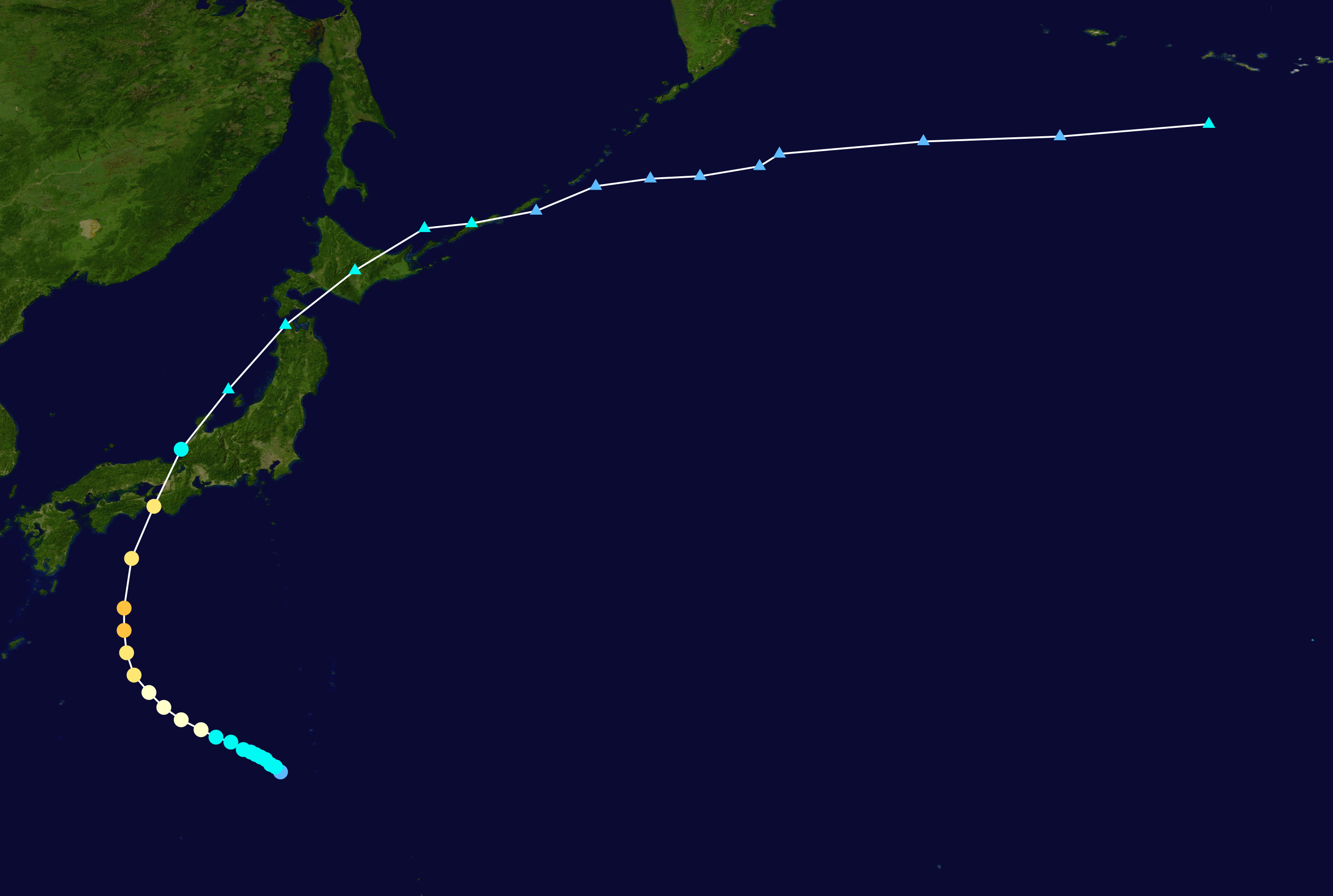
- Duration: August 29 – September 3
- Peak intensity: 185 km/h (115 mph) (1-min); 943 hPa (mbar)

Typhoon Jane struck the island of Shikoku in Japan on 3 September. Resulting flooding and landslides killed 539 people.

In late August, a depression formed and quickly intensified into a tropical storm and was given the name Jane. The storm drifted west northwestward and intensified into a typhoon. Jane gradually curved to the north and intensified to a category 2 typhoon. Jane shortly reached category 3 status and peak intensity at 185 km/h (115 mph). The typhoon accelerated to the north-northeast and weakened to a category 2 storm and made landfall in the modern-day Osaka-Kobe-Kyoto area. Jane crossed Kyoto Prefecture and weakened to a tropical storm and crossed the Noto Peninsula and reentered the Sea of Japan and passed just west of Sado Island. The storm struck eastern Aomori Prefecture and crossed the Tsugaru Straits and made a final landfall on the south coast of Hokkaido Prefecture. Jane crossed Hokkaido and dissipated south of the Kuril Islands.

=== Typhoon Kezia ===
- Typhoon (JMA)
- Category 3 typhoon (SSHWS)
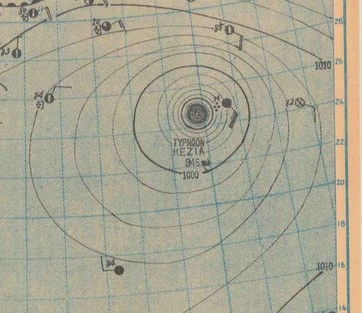
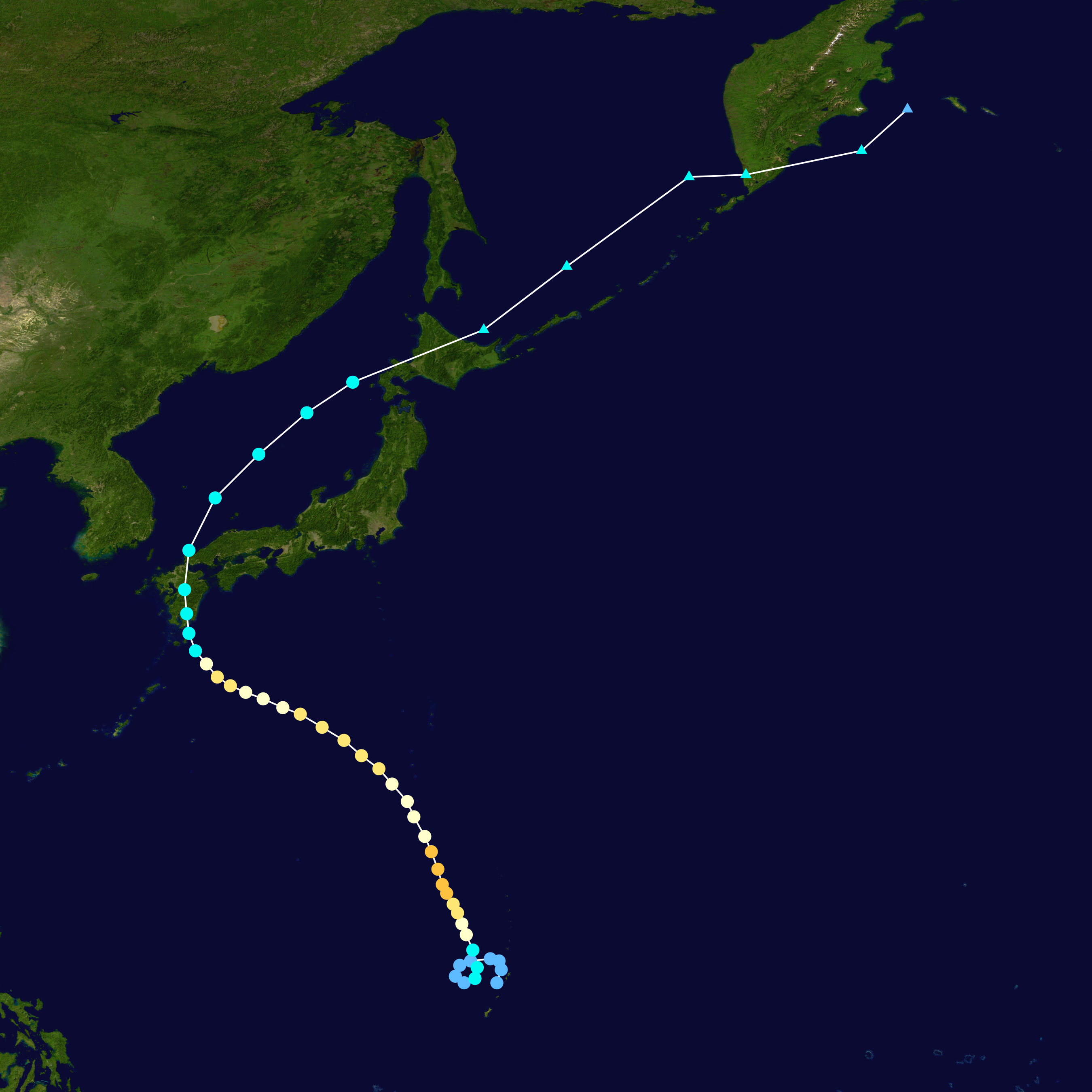
- Duration: September 4 – September 14
- Peak intensity: 185 km/h (115 mph) (1-min); 945 hPa (mbar)

On September 13 Typhoon Kezia hit part of the fleet off Kyushu.

P-51 Mustangs belonging to No. 77 Squadron RAAF were grounded at Iwakuni because of the typhoon on September 13 and 14.

There was great damage in western Japan. In Japan, 30 dead, 19 missing people, 35 injured. The total damage and breakage of the house is 4,836. There are 121,1924 inundated houses. In the Itsukushima Shrine the building was damaged, the Kintai Bridge was lost.

=== Severe Tropical Storm Twenty-six ===
- Severe tropical storm (CMA)
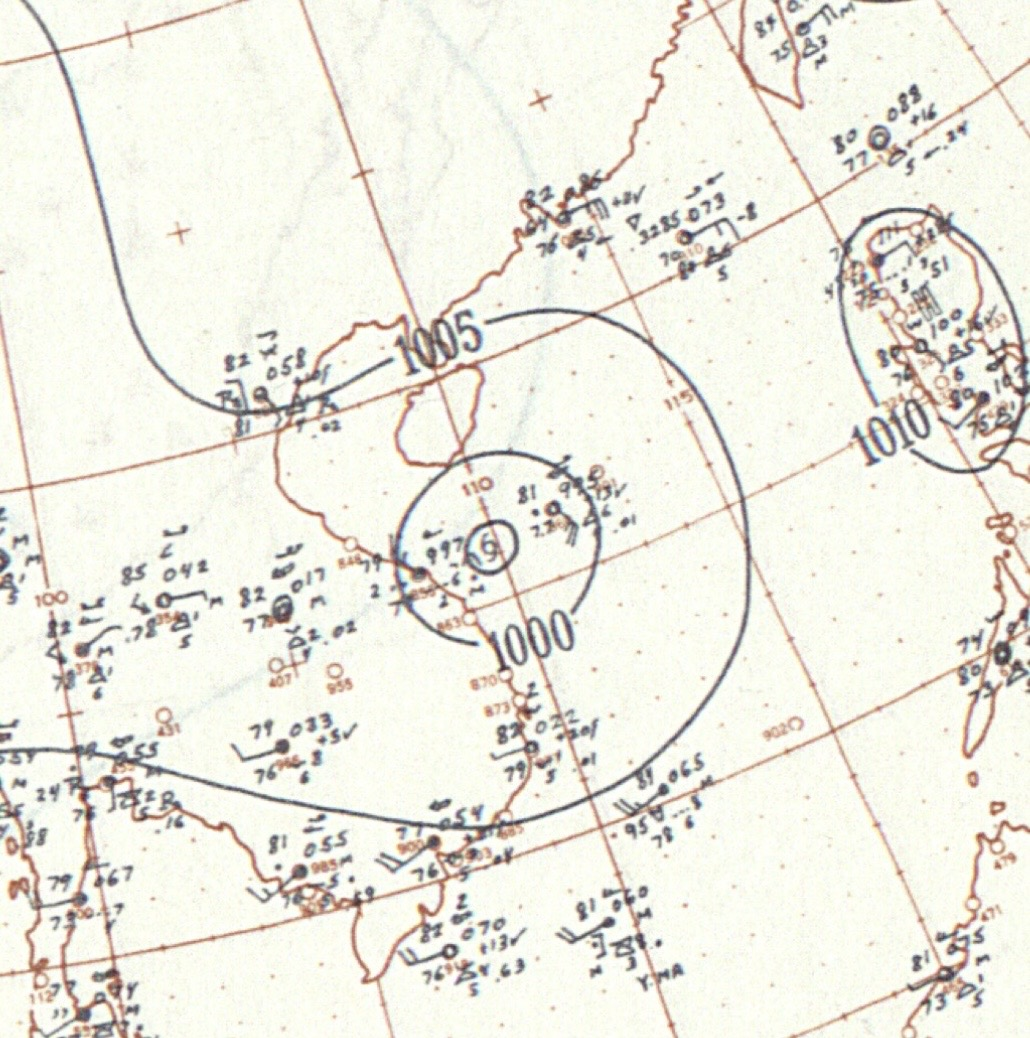
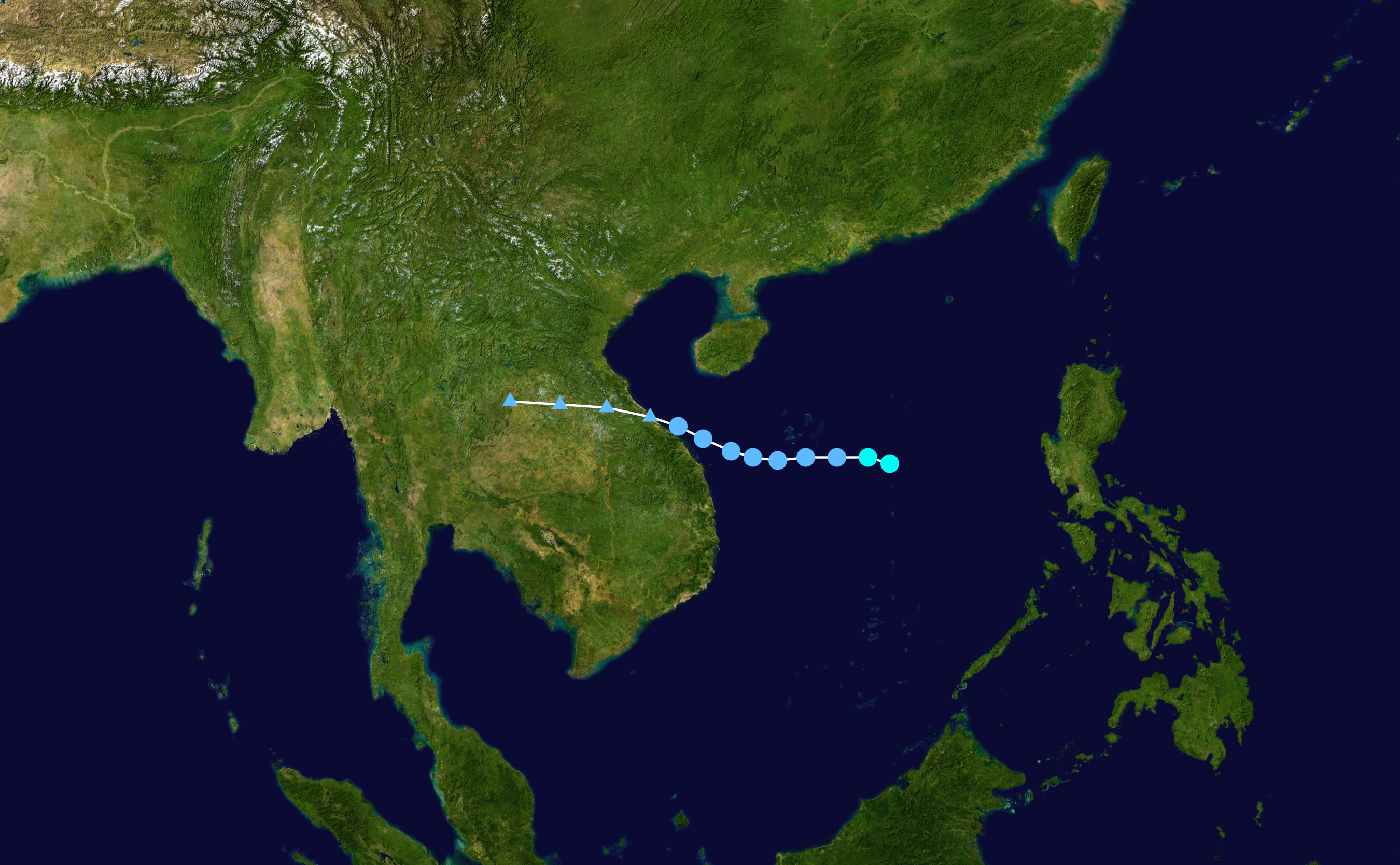
- Duration: September 6 – September 8
- Peak intensity: 95 km/h (60 mph) (10-min); 995 hPa (mbar)

This storm tracked through Vietnam and Laos.

=== Tropical Storm Lucretia–Nancy ===
- Tropical storm (JMA)
- Tropical storm (SSHWS)
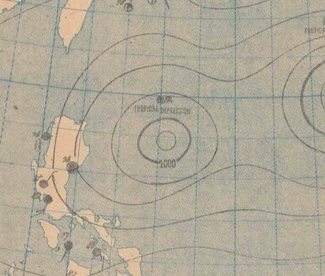
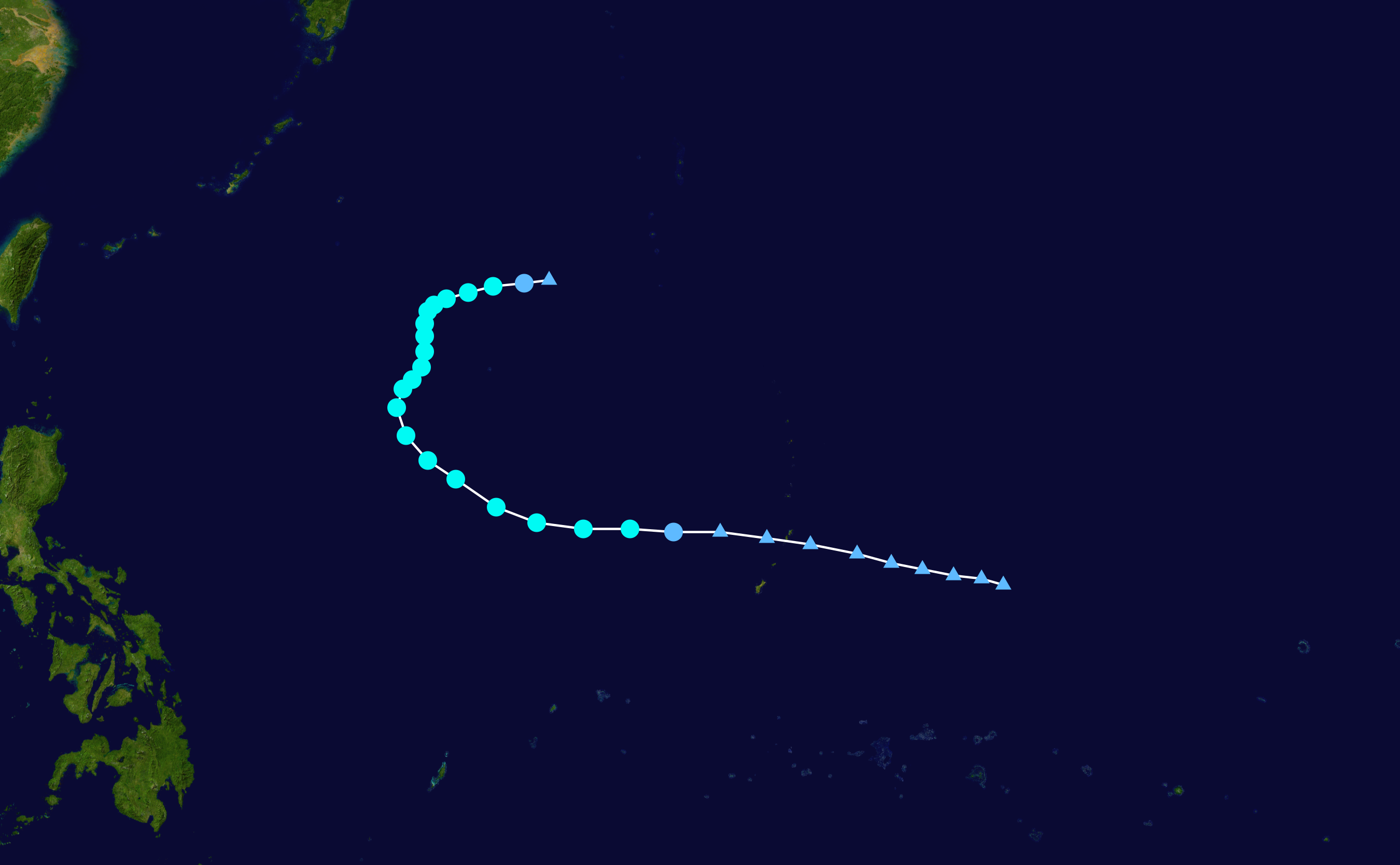
- Duration: September 14 – September 19
- Peak intensity: 100 km/h (65 mph) (1-min); 987 hPa (mbar)

The storm was first tracked by CMA on September 11.

=== Typhoon Missatha ===
- Typhoon (JMA)
- Category 1 typhoon (SSHWS)
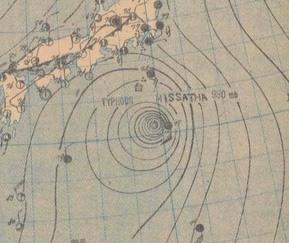
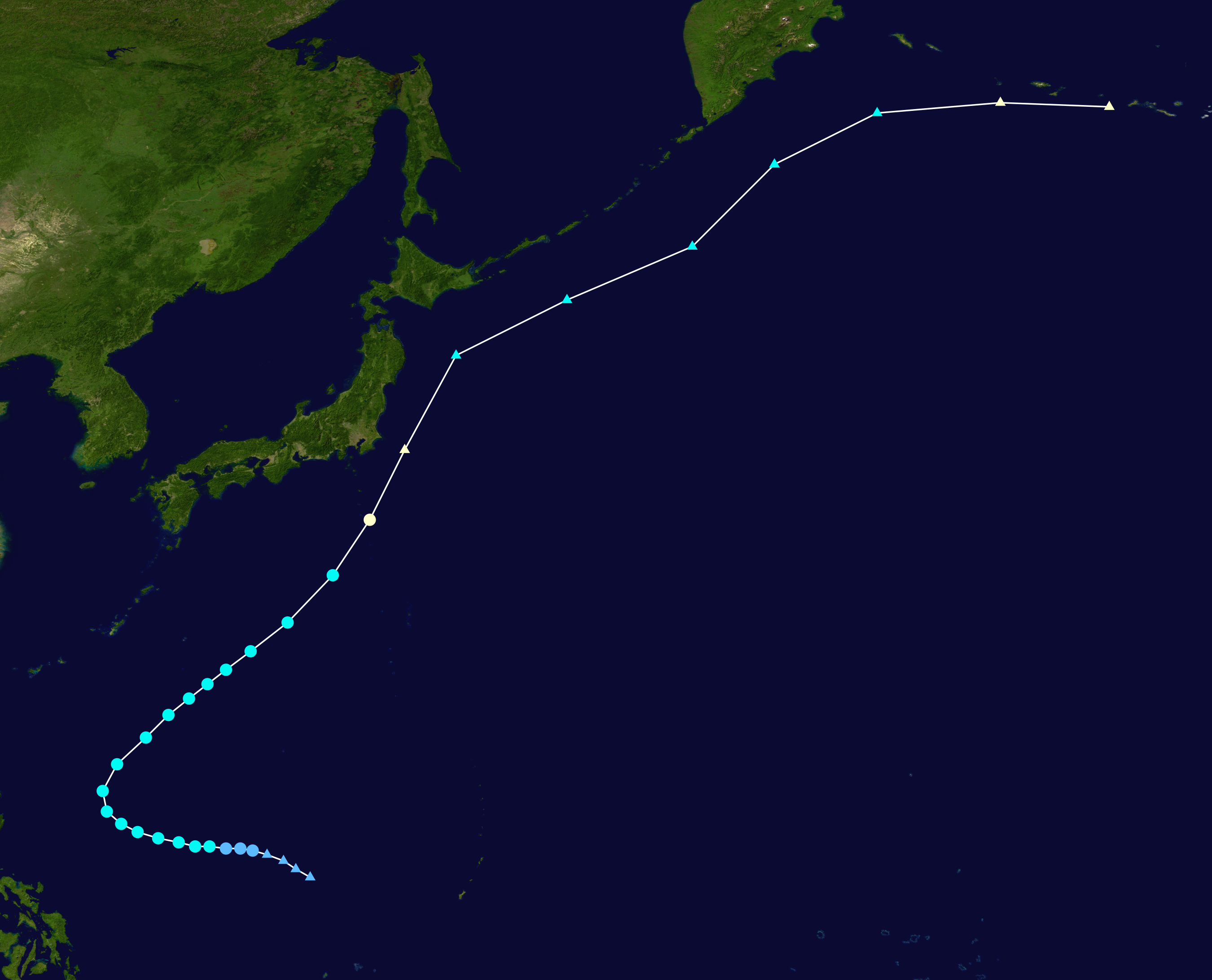
- Duration: September 13 – September 18
- Peak intensity: 130 km/h (80 mph) (1-min); 984 hPa (mbar)

Typhoon Missatha paralleled Japan.

=== Typhoon Ossia ===
- Typhoon (JMA)
- Category 3 typhoon (SSHWS)
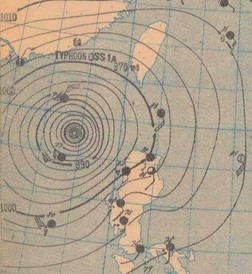
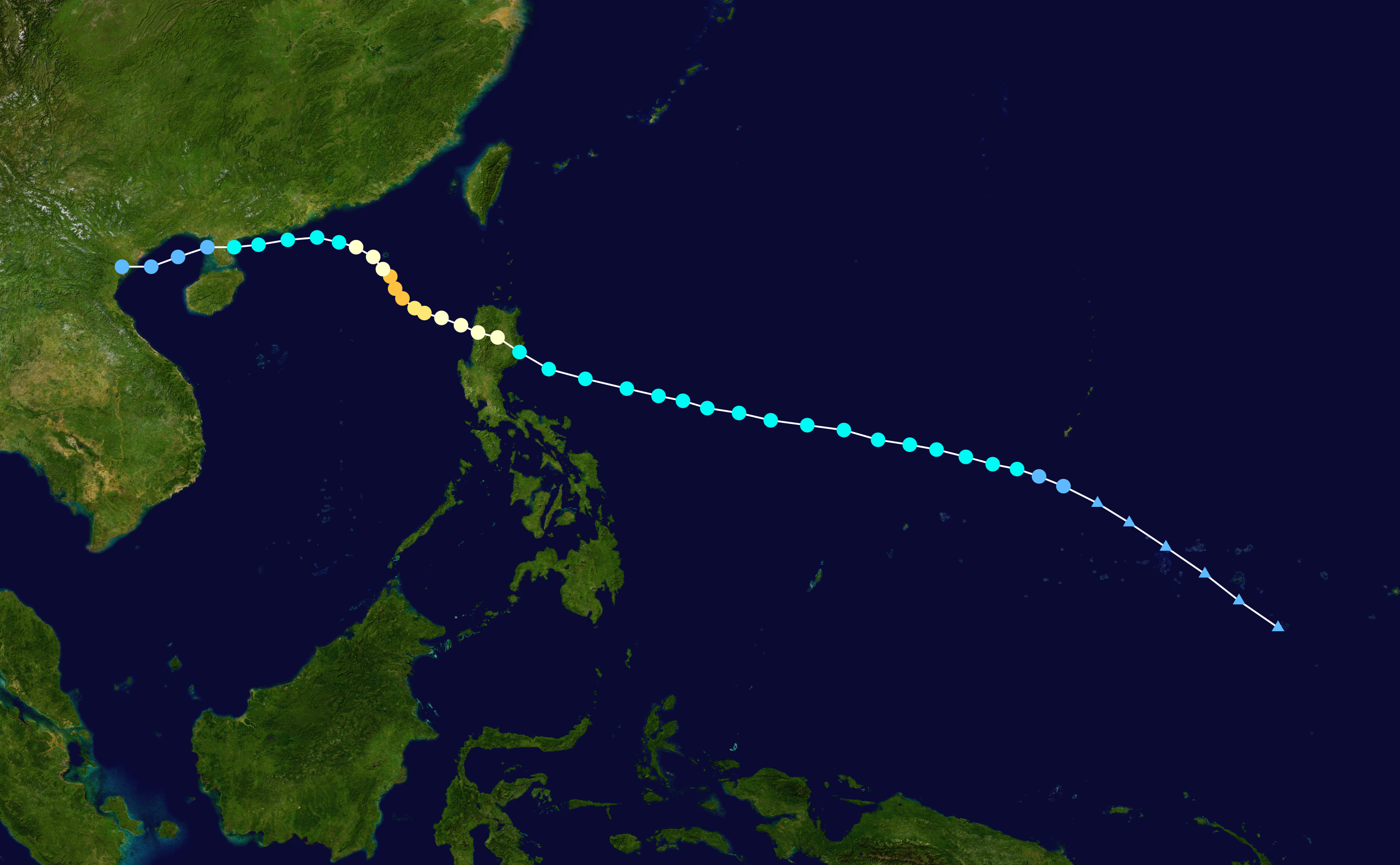
- Duration: September 27 – October 6
- Peak intensity: 185 km/h (115 mph) (1-min); 966 hPa (mbar)

Typhoon Ossia impacted the Philippines.

=== Typhoon Petie ===
- Typhoon (JMA)
- Category 2 typhoon (SSHWS)
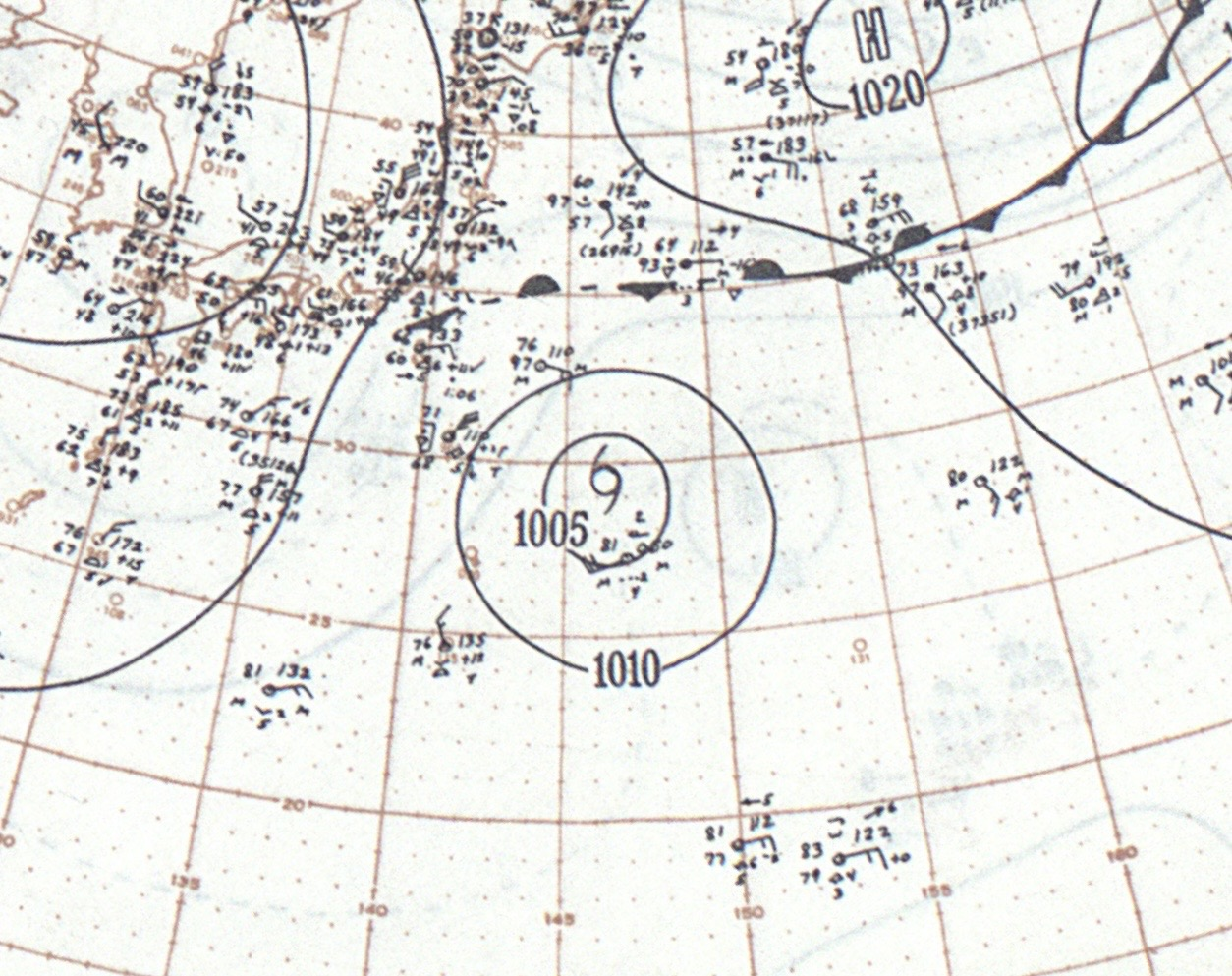
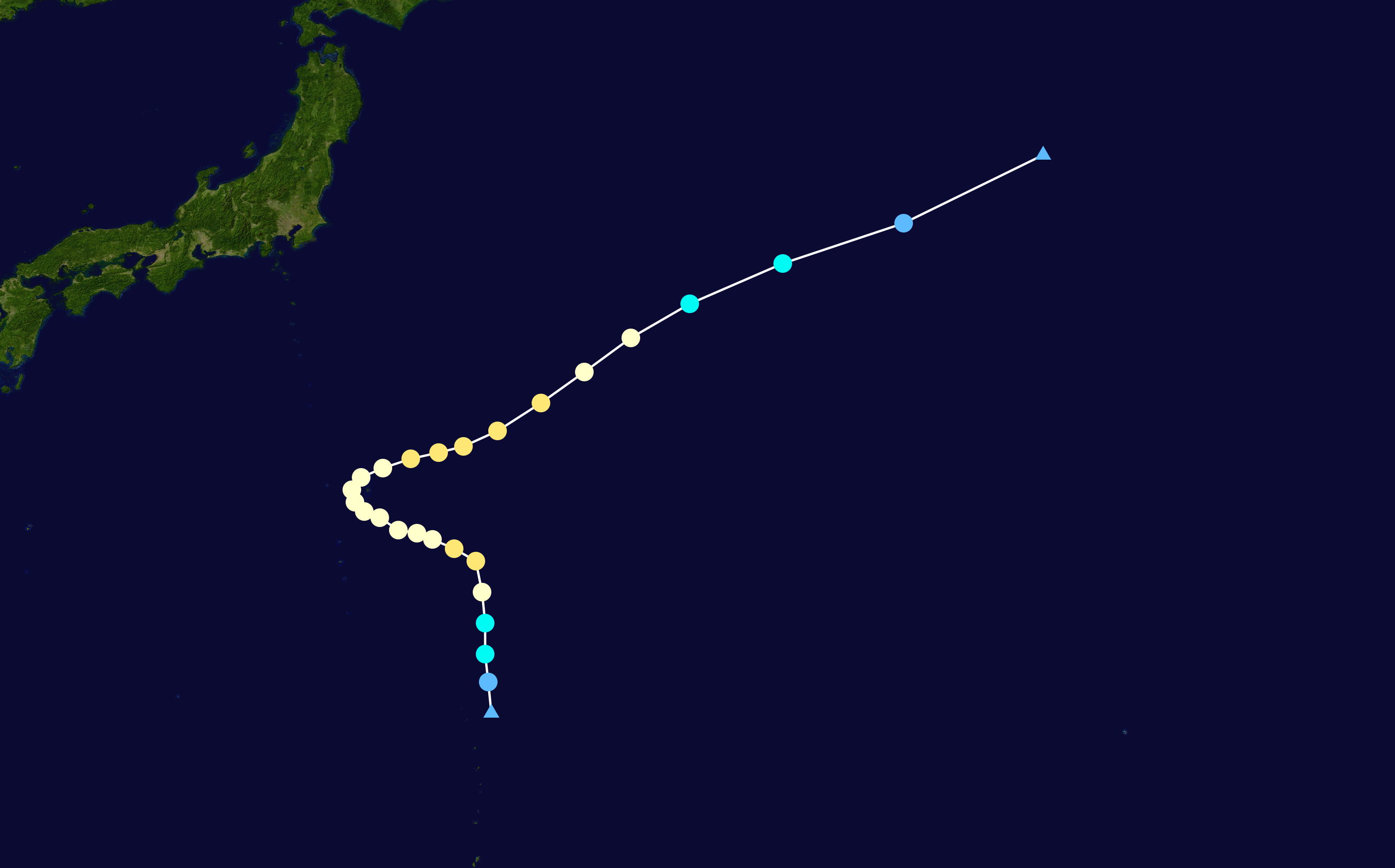
- Duration: October 18 – October 24
- Peak intensity: 165 km/h (105 mph) (1-min); 978 hPa (mbar)

Petie was a category 2 typhoon that stayed out at sea.

=== Severe Tropical Storm Thirty-five ===
- Severe tropical storm (CMA)
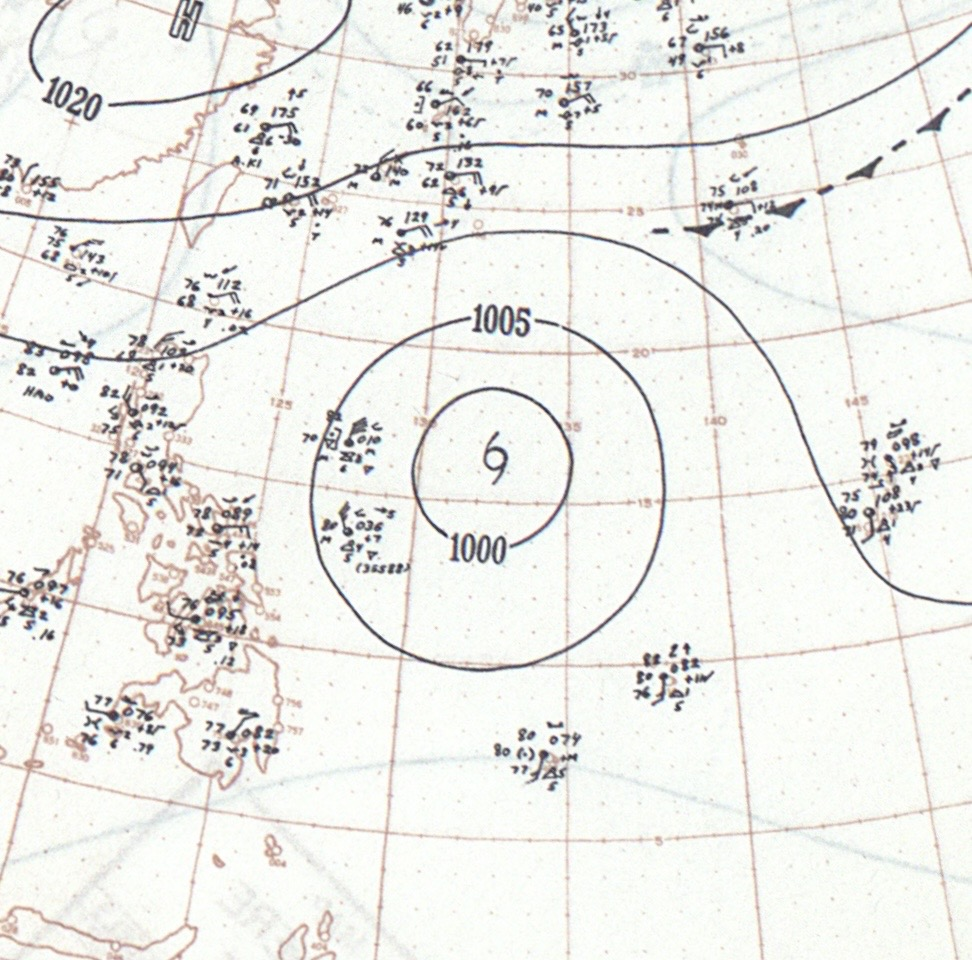
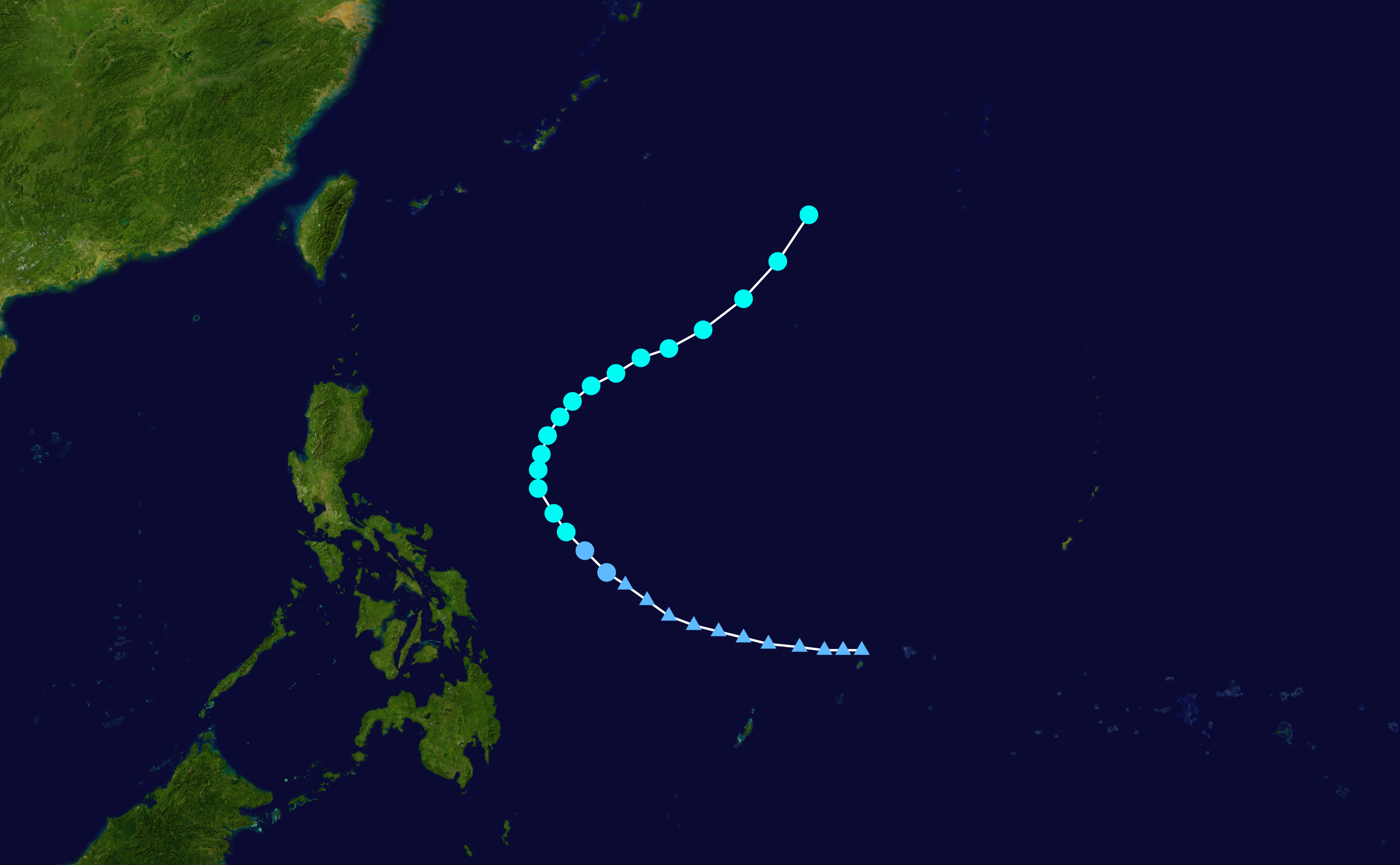
- Duration: October 26 – October 31
- Peak intensity: 95 km/h (60 mph) (10-min); 995 hPa (mbar)

The storm didn't make landfall.

=== Typhoon Ruby–Anita ===
- Typhoon (JMA)
- Category 3 typhoon (SSHWS)
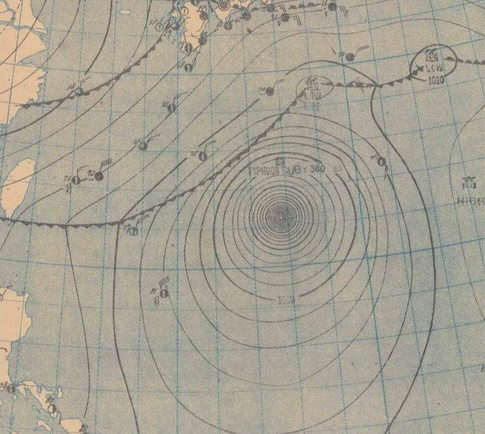
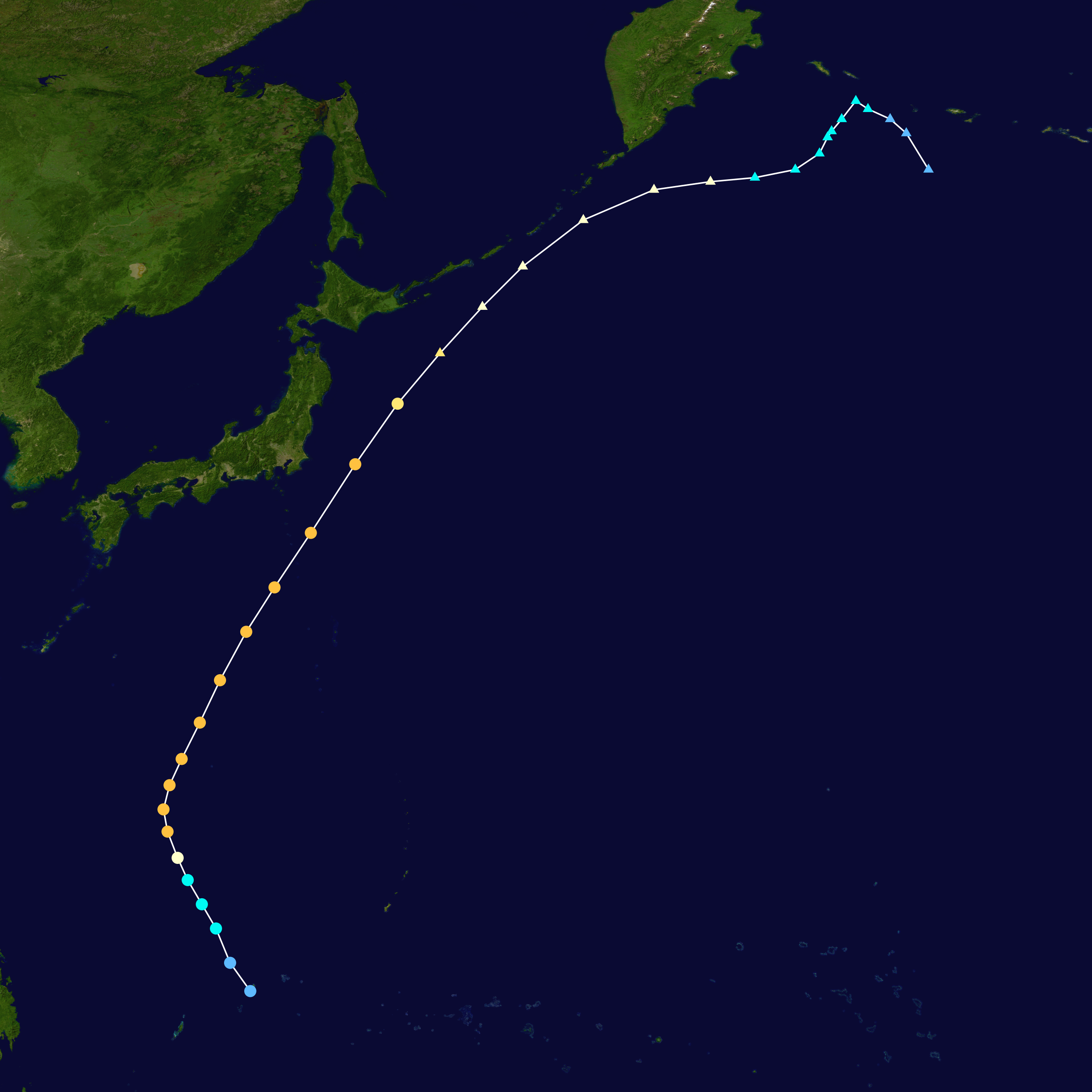
- Duration: October 27 – October 31
- Peak intensity: 185 km/h (115 mph) (1-min); 918 hPa (mbar)

The storm stayed out at sea without affecting land.

=== Typhoon Billie ===
- Typhoon (JMA)
- Category 1 typhoon (SSHWS)
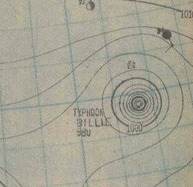
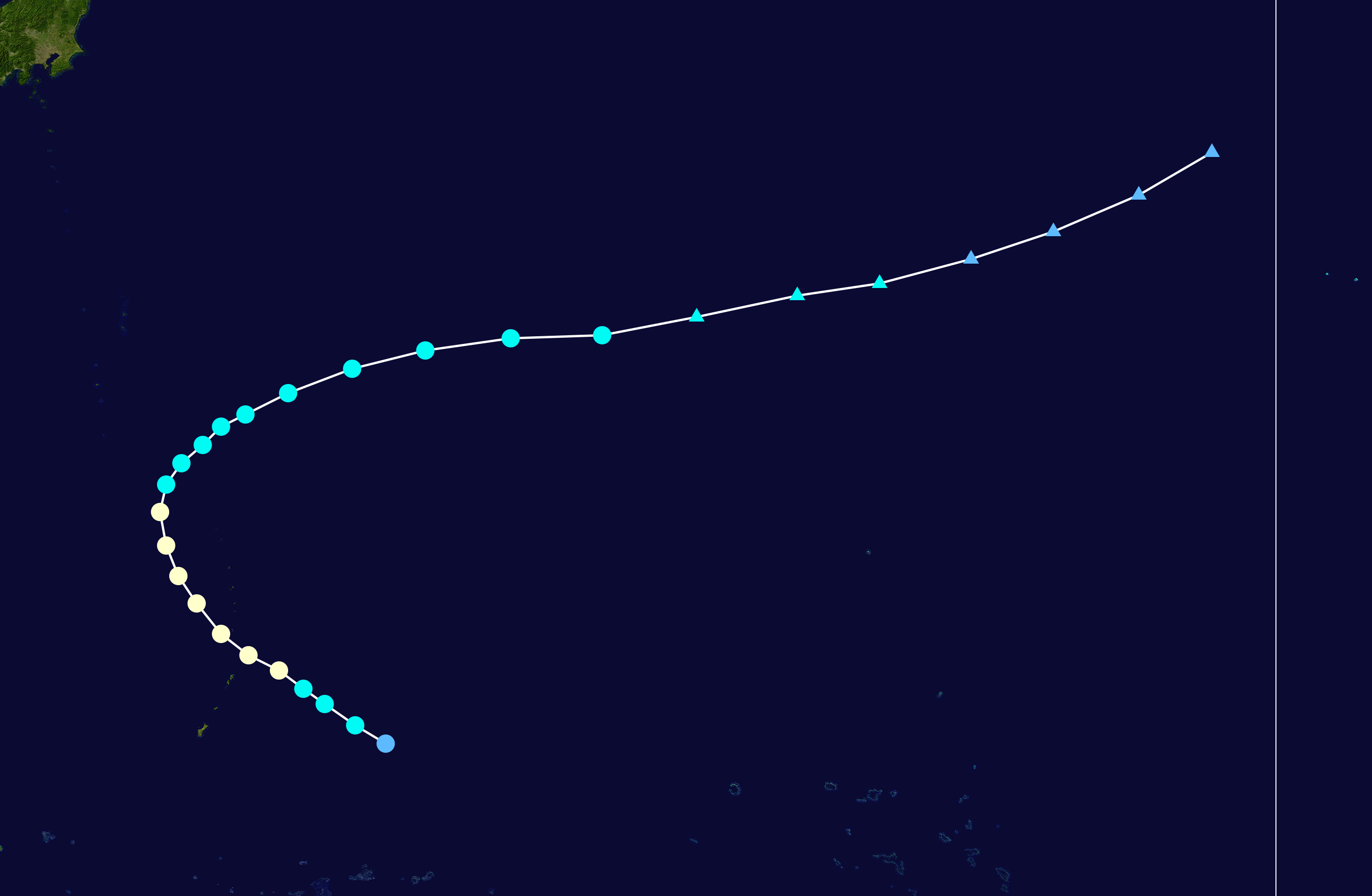
- Duration: November 4 – November 9
- Peak intensity: 150 km/h (90 mph) (1-min); 985 hPa (mbar)

Billie was a category 1 typhoon that stayed out at sea.

=== Typhoon Clara ===
- Typhoon (JMA)
- Category 4 typhoon (SSHWS)
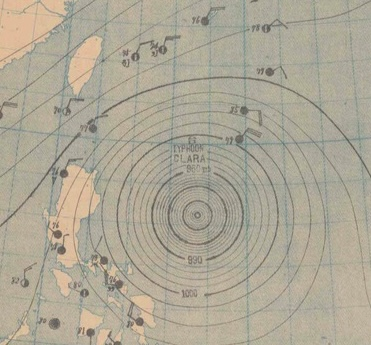
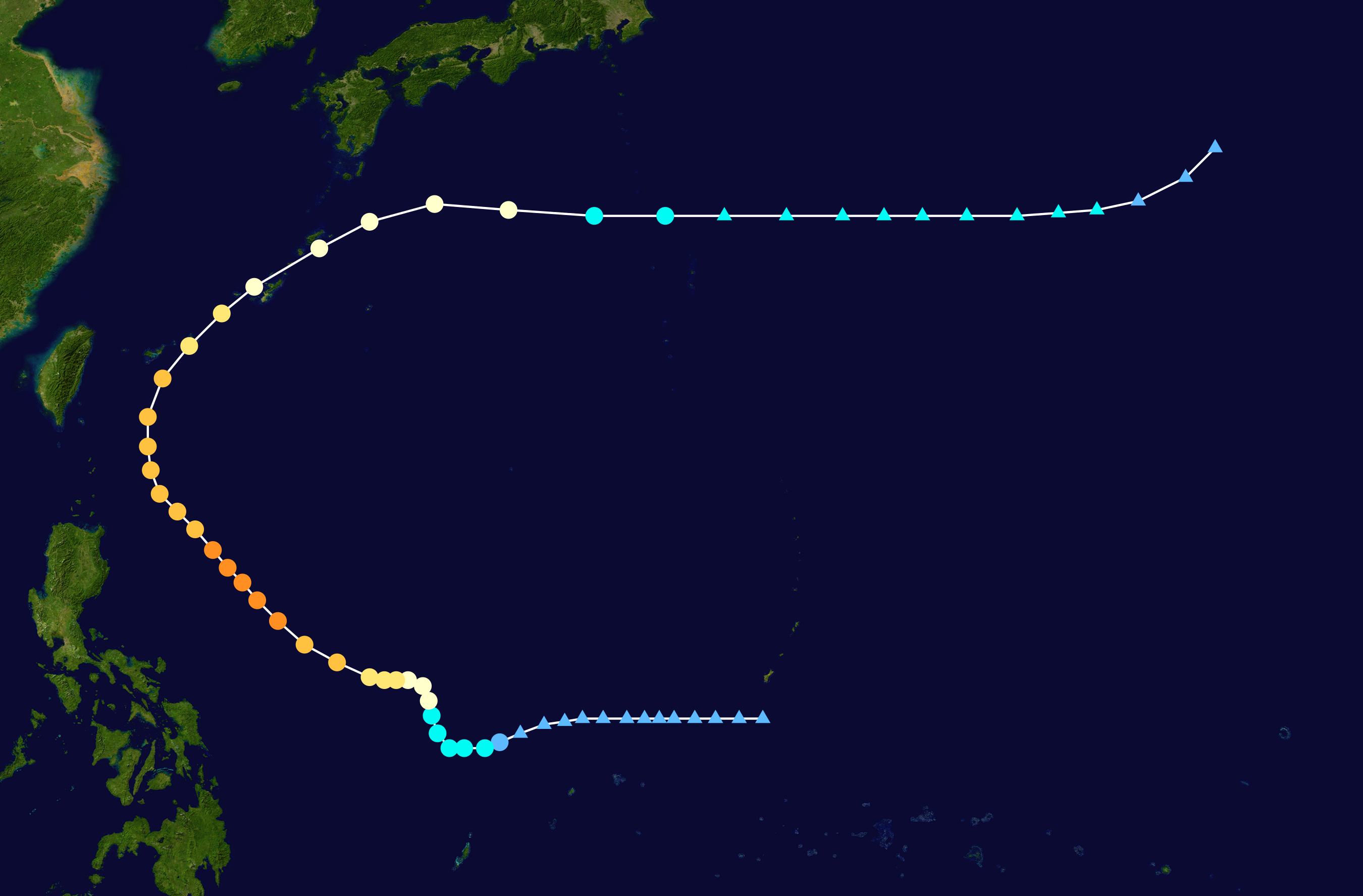
- Duration: November 4 – November 12
- Peak intensity: 230 km/h (145 mph) (1-min); 899 hPa (mbar)

Clara was a Category 4 typhoon that didn't make landfall.

=== Tropical Storm Delilah ===
- Tropical storm (JMA)
- Tropical storm (SSHWS)
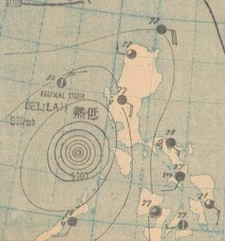
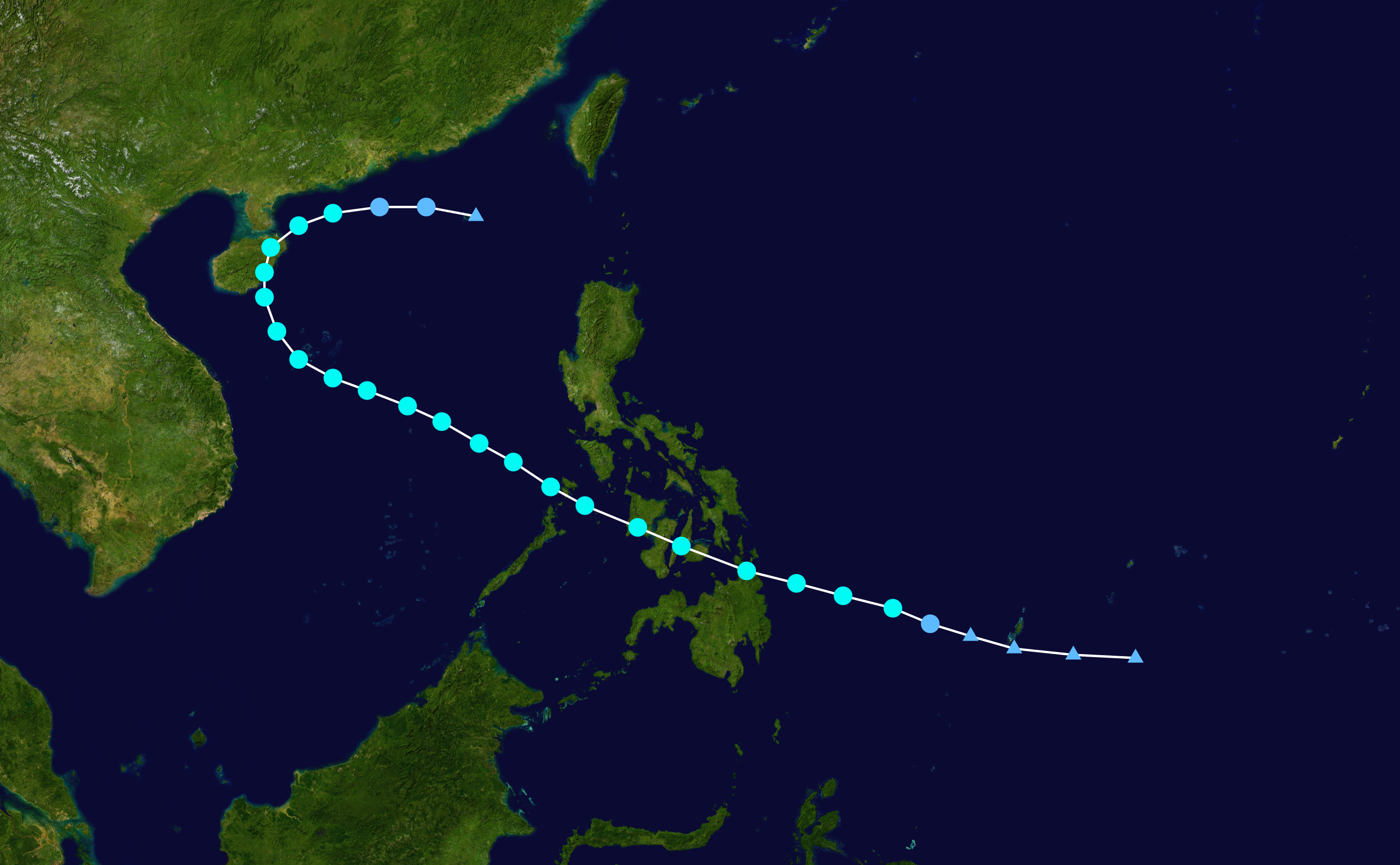
- Duration: November 19 – November 25
- Peak intensity: 110 km/h (70 mph) (1-min); 989 hPa (mbar)

This tropical storm affected the Philippines.

=== Tropical Storm Ellen ===
- Tropical storm (SSHWS)
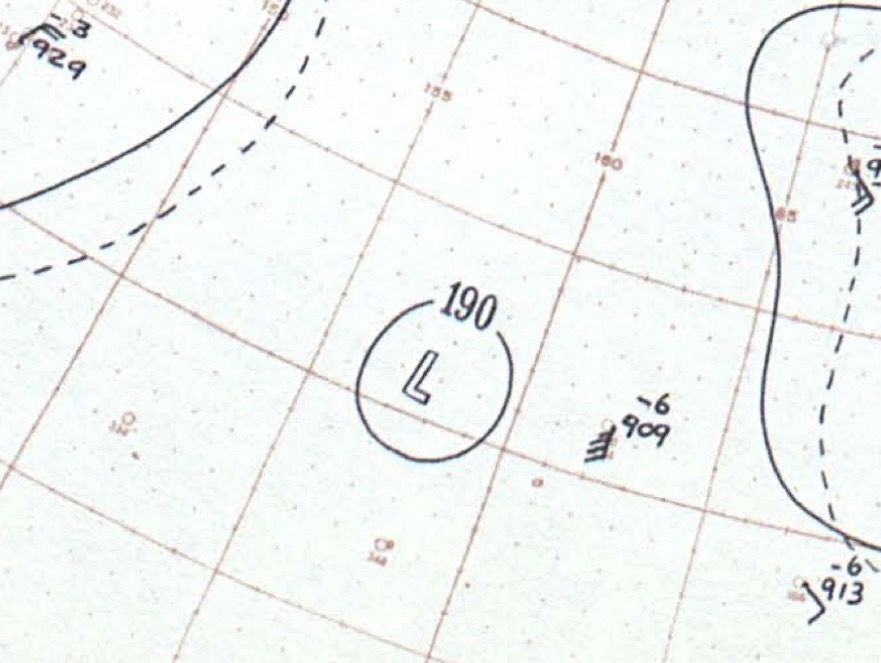
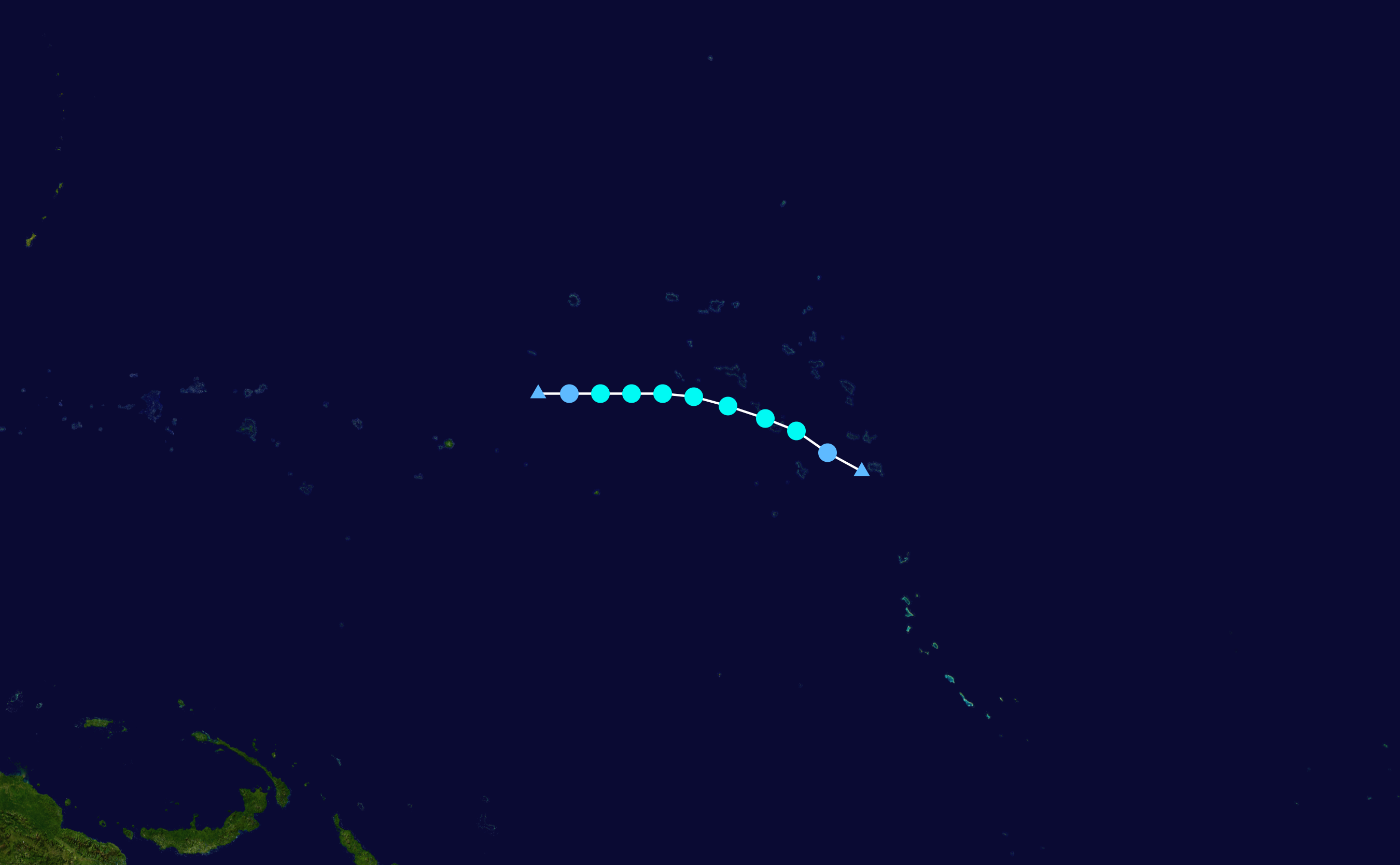
- Duration: December 11 – December 13
- Peak intensity: 110 km/h (70 mph) (1-min); 990 hPa (mbar)

Ellen remained at sea, without impacting land.

=== Typhoon Fran ===
- Typhoon (JMA)
- Category 1 typhoon (SSHWS)
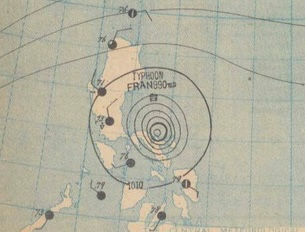
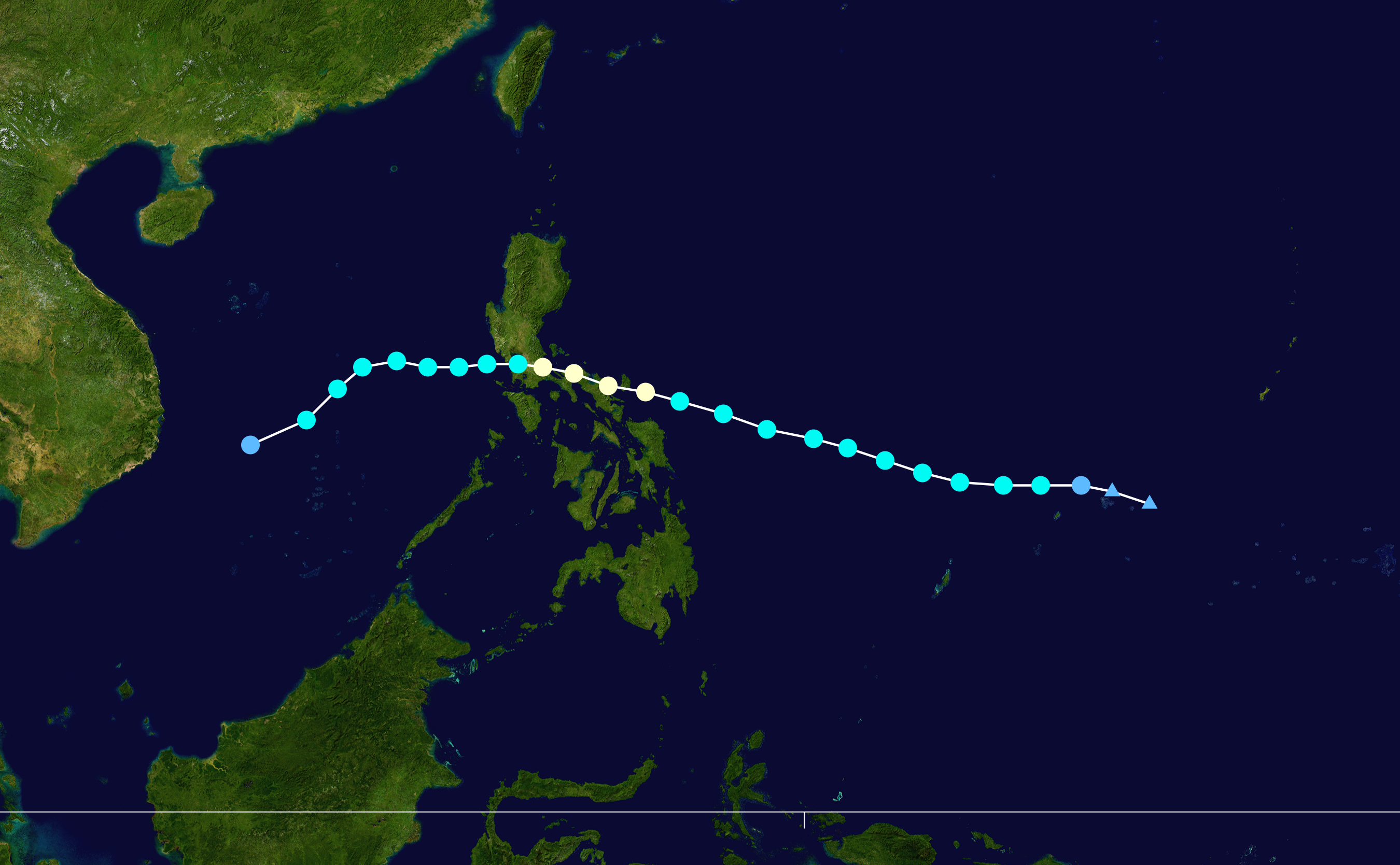
- Duration: December 26 – January 1
- Peak intensity: 150 km/h (90 mph) (1-min); 980 hPa (mbar)

Typhoon Fran was a late season storm that struck the northern Philippines killing 5 people.

== Storm names ==
The names came from a series of four rotating lists. Names were used one after the other without regard to year, and when the bottom of one list was reached, the next named storm received the name at the top of the next list. The names Elsie, Flossie, Jane, Kezia, Lucretia, Missatha, Ossia, Petie, Ruby, Salome, Anita, Billie, Clara, Delilah, Ellen, and Fran were used for the first time this season. Hurricane Hiki was named Salome by Guam's Air Weather Service, despite never entering the Western Pacific Basin.

- Doris
- Elsie
- Flossie
- Grace
- Helene
- Ida
- Jane
- Kezia
- Lucretia
- Missatha
- Nancy
- Ossia
- Petie
- Ruby
- Salome
- Anita
- Billie
- Clara
- Delilah
- Ellen
- Fran

=== Names decommissioned ===
For unknown reasons, the names Helene, Jane, Kezia, Lucretia, Missatha, Ossia, Petie, Salome, and Delilah were replaced with Helen, June, Kathy, Lorna, Marie, Olga, Pamela, Sally, and Dot when this list was reused for the 1953, 1954, and 1955 seasons respectively.

== See also ==
- 1950 Atlantic hurricane season
- List of Pacific typhoon seasons
- 1950s South-West Indian Ocean cyclone seasons
- 1950s Australian region cyclone seasons
- 1950s South Pacific cyclone seasons
