= List of named storms (B) =

Storms are named for historical reasons to avoid confusion when communicating with the public, as more than one storm can exist at a time. Names are drawn in order from predetermined lists. For tropical cyclones, names are assigned when a system has one-, three-, or ten-minute winds of more than 65 km/h (40 mph). Standards, however, vary from basin to basin. For example, some tropical depressions are named in the Western Pacific, while within the Australian and Southern Pacific regions, the naming of tropical cyclones are delayed until they have gale-force winds occurring more than halfway around the storm center.

This list covers the letter B.

== Storms ==
Note: † indicates the name was retired after that usage in the respective basin

- Baaz (2005) – a cyclonic storm that struck southern India.
- Babe

- 1962 – a tropical storm that made landfall on the central Vietnam coast.
- 1965 – a severe tropical storm that brushed southern China and struck Taiwan.
- 1967 – a tropical storm over the open western Pacific.
- 1971 – a tropical storm that passed between the Philippines and Taiwan.
- 1974 – a tropical storm that passed near the Marianas.
- September 1977 – an Atlantic hurricane that struck Louisiana.
- September 1977 – a strong typhoon that passed through the southern Ryukyu Islands and later struck northeastern China; the minimum sea-level pressure in Japanese land of 907.3hPa was recorded by Babe at Okinoerabu Island.

- Babette (1977) – a tropical storm in the south-west Indian Ocean.
- Babie (1992) – a short-lived tropical storm in the south-west Indian Ocean.
- Babiola (2000) – a tropical cyclone in the south-west Indian Ocean.
- Babs

- 1951 – a typhoon over the open western Pacific.
- 1956 – a typhoon that passed between South Korea and Japan.
- 1959 – a tropical storm that struck the northwestern Philippines and Taiwan.
- 1998 – a powerful typhoon that struck the Philippines and Taiwan, killing 327 people.

- Bailu

- 2019 – a tropical storm that struck Taiwan and China.
- 2025 – a weak tropical storm that passed east of Japan.

- Baker

- 1950 – a hurricane that struck the Lesser Antilles, Puerto Rico, Cuba, and Alabama, causing 38 deaths.
- 1951 – a tropical storm that passed east of Bermuda.
- 1952 – a hurricane that passed between North Carolina and Bermuda.

- Bako (2001) – formerly Cyclone Bessi in the Australian region, it was renamed upon entering the south-west Indian Ocean.
- Bakoly (1983) – a tropical cyclone in the south-west Indian Ocean that passed near Mauritius.
- Bakung

- 2014 – a strong tropical cyclone over the open Indian Ocean.
- 2025 – a Category 4 severe tropical cyclone that stayed at sea.

- Balita (2022) – a tropical storm that remained far out to sea.
- Bandu (2010) – a cyclonic storm near Somalia
- Bang-Lang (2026) – a Category 1 typhoon that stayed at sea.
- Bansi (2014) – a very intense tropical cyclone in the south-west Indian Ocean that passed near Rodrigues.
- Banyan

- 2005 – a tropical storm that struck Japan.
- 2011 – struck the Philippines, killed 10 people.
- 2017 – a strong typhoon over the open western Pacific.
- 2022 – remained out at sea.

- Baomavo (1990) – a tropical cyclone in the south-west Indian Ocean.
- Bapo (2015) – a subtropical cyclone southeast of Brazil.
- Barang

- 1967 – a short-lived tropical storm and dissipated east of the Philippines.
- 1971 – a Category 3 typhoon made landfall Philippines and affected South China and Vietnam.
- 1979 – a Category 3 typhoon that did not approach land.
- 1983 – a tropical storm that did not approach land.

- Barbara

- 1946 – peaked as a Category 3 typhoon before making landfall in the Philippines as Category 1.
- 1953 – strong category 1 hurricane which moved up the U.S. east coast.
- 1954 – hit Louisiana as a moderate tropical storm.
- 1960 – a short-lived tropical storm in the south-west Indian Ocean.
- 1967 – a tropical cyclone in the South Pacific Ocean.
- 1975 – struck Madagascar twice.
- 1983 – a category 4 hurricane in the eastern Pacific that stayed far from land.
- 1989 – a category 1 hurricane in the eastern Pacific.
- 1995 – a strong category 4 hurricane that dissipated near Hawaii.
- 2001 – a tropical storm that passed close to Hawaii.
- 2007 – a tropical storm that made landfall near border of Guatemala and Mexico.
- 2013 – a large category 1 hurricane that made landfall on the Isthmus of Tehuantepec in Mexico.
- 2019 – a powerful category 4 hurricane that did not affect land.
- 2025 – a Category 1 hurricane that paralleled the Mexican coast.

- Barbarine (1961) – a tropical cyclone in the South Pacific Ocean.
- Barijat

- 2018 – a weak tropical storm that caused flooding in the far northern regions of the Philippines and struck Southern China.
- 2024 – a weak tropical storm which stayed at sea.

- Barisaona (1988) – an intense tropical cyclone in the south-west Indian Ocean.
- Barry

- 1983 – made landfall on Florida as a tropical storm, weakened to a depression before crossing, strengthened into a hurricane after exiting into the Gulf of Mexico; later struck Mexico, causing some damage.
- 1989 – dissipated in the mid-Atlantic without threatening land.
- 1995 – formed off South Carolina then moved north, making landfall on eastern tip of Nova Scotia, causing no damage.
- 1996† – a Category 4 severe tropical cyclone that struck Northern Territory and Queensland.
- 2001 – made landfall in Florida, causing two deaths and $30 million in damage.
- 2007 – short-lived tropical storm that made landfall in western Florida.
- 2013- made landfall in Belize as a tropical depression before making landfall in Mexico while in the Bay of Campeche.
- 2019 – formed off the Gulf Coast before making landfall in Louisiana as a category 1 hurricane.
- 2025 – short-lived tropical storm that formed in the Bay of Campeche and made landfall in Mexico as a tropical depression.

- Bart

- 1996 – a typhoon that passed east of the Philippines.
- 1998 – a tropical cyclone that killed 10 people in French Polynesia.
- 1999 – a typhoon that struck Japan.
- 2017 – a tropical cyclone in the South Pacific that affected the Cook Islands.

- Basiang

- 1964 – a relatively strong typhoon which brushed Taiwan, northern Philippines and southern China before eventually making landfall in Vietnam.
- 1976 – a minimal tropical storm which stayed at sea
- 1980 – a tropical depression that was only recognized by PAGASA and JMA.

- Basyang

- 2002 – affected Micronesia, killing one person and causing $150 million in damages.
- 2006 – a tropical depression that was only recognized by PAGASA and JTWC.
- 2010 – a poorly-forecasted minimal typhoon which caused destruction in the Philippines.
- 2014 – an early January tropical storm.
- 2018 – a weak tropical cyclone that affected southern and central parts of the Philippines in mid-February 2018.
- 2022 – extremely large early-season Category 3-equivalent typhoon that remained out to sea.
- 2026 – weak tropical storm that made landfall in the Southern Philippines.

- Batsirai (2022) – a deadly tropical cyclone which heavily impacted Madagascar in February 2022, becoming the strongest tropical cyclone to strike Madagascar since Cyclone Enawo in 2017.
- Bavi

- 2002 – a tropical storm southeast of Japan.
- 2008 – a tropical storm southeast of Japan.
- 2015 – a tropical storm that moved through the Marshall Islands.
- 2020 – Category 3 typhoon that made landfall in North Korea.
- 2026 – a powerful and long-lived Category 5 super typhoon that ravaged the Northern Mariana Islands and China.

- Beatrice

- 1947 – a tropical storm over the open Western Pacific.
- 1959 – a tropical cyclone in the South Pacific Ocean.
- 1972 – formerly Cyclone Ivy in the Australian basin, it was renamed Beatrice when it crossed into the south-west Indian Ocean.

- Beatriz

- 1981 – a hurricane southwest of Mexico.
- 1987 – a tropical storm southwest of Mexico.
- 1993 – a tropical storm that made landfall in southeastern Mexico, killing six.
- 1999 – a Category 3 hurricane that moved across the eastern Pacific Ocean.
- 2005 – a tropical storm southwest of Mexico.
- 2011 – a Category 1 hurricane that grazed southwestern Mexico and killed four.
- 2017 – a tropical storm that made landfall in southeastern Mexico, killing seven.
- 2023 – a Category 1 hurricane that dissipated shortly after forming, briefly threatened land.

- Bebe (1972)† – a tropical cyclone that affected Tuvalu and Fiji, killing 25 people.
- Bebeng

- 1963 – tropical storm that affected the northern Philippines and hit Japan.
- 1967 – a Category 2 typhoon that hit the Philippines in early march.
- 1971 – a weak tropical storm that looped east of Mindanao before heading northwest.
- 1975 – a deadly tropical cyclone that triggered the Banqiao Dam collapse in China's Henan Province, China in August 1975.
- 1979 – struck the Philippines.
- 1983 – struck the Philippines.
- 1991 – struck the Philippines.
- 1995 – struck China.
- 1999 – remained in the open ocean.
- 2007 – a powerful tropical cyclone that battered Japan as a weakening typhoon and became the second super typhoon of the 2007 Pacific typhoon season, just after Yutu.
- 2011† – a mild tropical storm that affected eastern Philippines and southern Japan.

- Bebinca

- 2000 – a tropical storm that hit the central Philippines; killed 26.
- 2006 – a tropical storm that swept across the Honshū coastal waters; 33 people dead or missing.
- 2013 – a tropical storm that struck Hainan and Vietnam.
- 2018 – a tropical storm that stalled near the southern coast of China before moving across Hainan and Vietnam.
- 2024 – passed the Ryukyu Islands and made landfall in Shanghai, China as the strongest storm since 1949.

- Becky

- 1958 – a tropical storm that moved across the Atlantic Ocean.
- 1962 – a tropical storm in the far eastern Atlantic Ocean
- 1966 – a hurricane that dissipated near Atlantic Canada.
- 1968 – a tropical cyclone in the South Pacific Ocean.
- 1970 – a tropical storm that made landfall on the Florida Panhandle.
- 1974 – a hurricane that formed southwest of Bermuda and moved across the Atlantic.
- 1990 – a typhoon that hit northern Luzon as a strong tropical storm; strengthened over the South China Sea and hit northern Vietnam as a category 1 typhoon.
- 1993 – a typhoon that brushed the northern end of Luzon; landfall in China.
- 2007 – a tropical cyclone in the South Pacific that threatened Vanuatu but did not make landfall.

- Bejisa (2013) – a tropical cyclone in the south-west Indian Ocean that passed near Réunion.
- Belal (2024) – Category 2 tropical cyclone that made landfall Réunion and Mauritius.
- Belinda

- 1967 – a tropical cyclone in the south-west Indian Ocean .
- 1972 – a tropical cyclone that passed near Christmas Island.

- Bella

- 1966 – a tropical storm northeast of Madagascar.
- 1973 – a tropical cyclone that struck northern Australia.
- 1991 – a tropical cyclone in the south-west Indian Ocean that sank a cargo ship, killing 36 people, and also passed near Rodrigues.

- Bellamine (1996) – formerly Cyclone Melanie in the Australian, it was renamed in the south-west Indian Ocean and became an intense tropical cyclone.
- Belle

- 1972 – a tropical depression in the south-west Indian Ocean that dissipated near Rodrigues.
- 1976 – a hurricane that struck New York and Connecticut, spurring widespread evacuations and killing 12 people.

- Belna (2019) – a tropical cyclone in the south-west Indian Ocean that struck northwestern Madagascar, killing nine people.
- Beltane (1998) – an erratic tropical storm in the Mozambique Channel that struck or approached Madagascar on four occasions.
- Bemany (1982) – a tropical cyclone in the south-west Indian Ocean that passed between Mauritius and Rodrigues.
- Bemazava (1987) – a tropical storm in the south-west Indian Ocean that executed a loop southeast of Rodrigues.
- Ben

- 1979 – a tropical storm that struck the Philippines.
- 1983 – a tropical storm that approached Japan.
- 1986 – a powerful typhoon that passed east of Japan.

- Benandro (1987) – a tropical storm that struck Madagascar.
- Benedicte (1981) – a tropical cyclone in the south-west Indian Ocean that brushed northern Madagascar and struck Mozambique, killing 13 people.
- Beni

- 2003 (February)† – an intense tropical cyclone in the South Pacific that passed near New Caledonia.
- 2003 (November) – an intense tropical cyclone that did not significantly affect land.

- Benilde (2011) – a tropical cyclone in the south-west Indian Ocean.
- Benjamine (1979) – a tropical cyclone in the south-west Indian Ocean that passed between Mauritius and Reunion.
- Bentha (1995) – a tropical storm in the south-west Indian Ocean that was absorbed by another tropical storm.
- Bento (2004) – the most intense tropical cyclone in November in the south-west Indian Ocean.
- Berenice (1979) – a tropical storm southeast of Madagascar.
- Berguitta (2018) – an intense tropical cyclone in the south-west Indian Ocean that passed Réunion and Mauritius.
- Bernadette (1973) – a tropical storm that passed north of Madagascar and affected the Comoros.
- Bernard (2008) – a tropical storm in the south-west Indian Ocean.
- Bernice

- 1962 – a tropical storm that made landfall in Baja California.
- 1965 – a tropical storm that formed south of Puerto Angel, Mexico; no landfall.
- 1969 – a hurricane off the southwest coast of Mexico.
- 1973 – a tropical storm that hit southwestern Mexico near Zihuatanejo.
- 1977 – a tropical storm that formed southeast of Acapulco and remained offshore Mexico.

- Bernida (1947) – a typhoon south of Japan.
- Bernie (2002) – a tropical cyclone that struck northern Australia.
- Berobia (1986) – a tropical storm that struck Mozambique.
- Bert (1980) – a tropical cyclone northwest of Australia that was renamed Christelle upon entering the south-west Indian Ocean.
- Bertha

- 1948 – a typhoon south of Japan.
- 1957 – a moderate tropical storm that threatened areas devastated by Hurricane Audrey two months earlier, but did not become a hurricane and caused only minor damage.
- 1962 – a tropical cyclone in the south-west Indian Ocean that passed between Mauritius and Rodrigues.
- 1964 – a tropical cyclone in the South Pacific and Australian region.
- 1968 – a tropical cyclone.
- 1984 – a minimal tropical storm that formed in the mid-Atlantic and never threatened land.
- 1990 – a Category 1 Hurricane that moved north, parallel to the east coast of the United States before dying over Nova Scotia leaving nine dead, including six on a ship sunk by the storm.
- 1996 – a Category 3 hurricane that crossed the Leeward Islands and passed near Puerto Rico, later making landfall in North Carolina as a Category 2 storm, causing $270 million in damage to the United States and its possessions and many indirect deaths.
- 2002 – a minimal tropical storm that formed only two hours before landfall in Louisiana, dissipated, exited back into the Gulf of Mexico, striking South Texas as a Tropical Depression. Bertha caused minimal damage, and one person drowned.
- 2008 – a long-lived Category 3 hurricane that had been upgraded to a tropical storm at 24.7°W, the easternmost tropical storm to form in July.
- 2014 – a Category 1 hurricane that affected the Antilles and the East Coast of the United States, and whose remnants affected Western Europe.
- 2020 – a pre-season tropical storm that formed only an hour before making landfall in South Carolina.
- 2026 – currently active.

- Berthe (1968) – formerly Cyclone Bettina in the Australian basin, it was renamed when it entered the south-west Indian Ocean.
- Bertie (2005) – a tropical cyclone west of Australia that was renamed Alvin in the south-west Indian Ocean.
- Beryl

- 1961 – a tropical cyclone that passed near Mauritius.
- 1966 – a tropical cyclone.
- 1973 – a Category 3 severe tropical cyclone that made landfall Western Australia caused minor wind damage was reported.
- 1982 – moved across Atlantic but dissipated north of the Windward Islands; caused moderate damage and 3 deaths in Cape Verde.
- 1988 – formed over Louisiana and drifted into the Gulf of Mexico before making landfall at New Orleans, causing one death at sea and about $4 million in damage.
- 1994 – went onshore at Panama City, Florida, 12 hours after forming; quickly went up the eastern states, dropping heavy rain and spawning many tornadoes; $73 million in damage, mostly in South Carolina.
- 2000 – made landfall in Mexico near the Texas border, causing one drowning death and some damage.
- 2006 – formed southeast of North Carolina, brushed coastal Massachusetts and dissipated over Atlantic Canada.
- 2012 – formed in late May, and made landfall in Jacksonville Beach, Florida with 70 mph (110 km/h) winds.
- 2018 – Category 1 hurricane which dissipated before approaching the Lesser Antilles; later briefly regenerated into a subtropical storm to the north of Bermuda.
- 2024† – destructive Category 5 hurricane, earliest Category 4 and Category 5 Atlantic hurricane on record in any season; made landfall on Carriacou, the Yucatán Peninsula, and in Texas.

- Bess

- 1952 – a typhoon that brushed the northern Philippines and Taiwan.
- 1957 – a typhoon that hit southern Japan, killing 20 people.
- 1960 – a typhoon that passed southeast of Japan and executed a loop.
- 1963 – a typhoon that hit southern Japan.
- 1965 – a powerful typhoon that passed east of the Marianas and Japan.
- 1968 – a typhoon that took an erratic track in the South China Sea, eventually hitting Vietnam.
- 1971 – a typhoon that hit Taiwan and China.
- 1974† – hit Hainan Island and the northern Philippines, and caused the disappearance of a reconnaissance aircraft.
- 1979 – a typhoon that passed between the Philippines and the Marianas.
- 1982† – a powerful typhoon that hit southern Japan and caused 59 deaths.

- Bessi

- 1990 – a tropical cyclone west of Australia.
- 2001 – a tropical cyclone west of Australia that was renamed Bako in the south-west Indian Ocean.

- Bessie (1964) – a tropical storm in the south-west Indian Ocean that dissipated near Mauritius.
- Beta

- 2005 – a Category 3 hurricane that made landfall in Nicaragua.
- 2020 – a tropical storm that made landfall in Texas.

- Beth

- 1971 – a hurricane that struck Nova Scotia.
- 1976† – a tropical cyclone that struck Queensland, Australia.
- 1996 – a severe tropical storm that struck the Philippines and Vietnam.

- Beti

- 1984 – a tropical cyclone in the South Pacific.
- 1996† – a tropical cyclone that Vanuatu and affected New Caledonia.

- Betsy

- 1956 – a hurricane that struck Puerto Rico, killing 36 people.
- 1961 – a hurricane that traversed much of the North Atlantic Ocean.
- 1965† – a powerful hurricane that looped near the Bahamas and later struck Florida and Louisiana, causing 81 deaths.
- 1968 – a tropical cyclone in the Australian region.
- 1970 – a tropical depression in the south-west Indian Ocean.
- 1981 – a tropical cyclone in the South Pacific.
- 1992† – a tropical cyclone in the South Pacific.

- Bettina

- 1968 – a tropical cyclone in the Australian region.
- 1981 – a tropical storm that struck Mozambique.
- 1993 – a tropical storm in the south-west Indian Ocean.

- Betty

- 1945 – a tropical storm south of Japan.
- 1946 – formed near the Philippines and passed southeast of Japan.
- 1949 – a tropical storm that moved across the Philippines and struck Vietnam.
- 1953 – a typhoon that struck the Philippines and Hainan island.
- 1958 – a typhoon in the South China Sea.
- 1961 – a typhoon that struck Taiwan and moved across eastern China.
- 1963 – a tropical storm in the south-west Indian ocean.
- 1964 – a typhoon that formed east of Taiwan and passed east of Shanghai.
- February 1966 – a tropical cyclone in the Australian region.
- August 1966 – a tropical storm that struck South Korea.
- 1969 – a typhoon that struck southeastern China.
- August 1972 – a super typhoon that struck China.
- August 1972 – an Atlantic hurricane that developed north-northeast of Bermuda and later looped in the northeastern Atlantic Ocean.
- April 1975 – a strong tropical cyclone that looped near Fiji.
- September 1975 – a typhoon that struck Taiwan and China.
- 1980 – a typhoon that struck the northern Philippines
- 1984 – a tropical storm that struck southern China.
- 1987 – a powerful typhoon that struck the Philippines and China, killing 92 people.
- 2015 – the local Philippines name for Tropical Storm Bavi, which moved across the central Philippines.
- 2019 – the local Philippines name for Typhoo Wutip, which was the most powerful February typhoon on record.
- 2023 – a Category 5-equivalent super typhoon which became the strongest tropical cyclone of 2023 thus far; severely affected Guam and later crossed Okinawa.

- Beulah

- 1959 – a tropical storm that affected the gulf coast of Mexico.
- 1963 – a hurricane that traversed much of the North Atlantic Ocean.
- 1967† – a powerful hurricane that affected much of the Caribbean and struck Mexico twice, killing 59 people.

- Beverley

- 1970 – a tropical cyclone that struck northern Australia
- 1974 – a tropical cyclone that struck Western Australia.

- Beverly (1948) – a typhoon that struck the northern Philippines.
- Bheki (2024) – a Category 4 tropical cyclone in the southern Indian Ocean.
- Bianca

- 2011 – a tropical cyclone that brushed Western Australia.
- 2025 – a Category 4 severe tropical cyclone that did not affect land.

- Bidang

- 1970 – a tropical storm that affected in the Philippines.
- 1974 – a Category 4 typhoon that made landfall in the Philippines and South China.
- 1978 – a tropical depression formed nearby Yap Island.
- 1982 – a severe tropical storm that brushed the coast of eastern Philippines.
- 1986 – late-season typhoon which spanned two calendar years and struck the Philippines.

- Biguá (2024) – a subtropical storm formed off the coast of the Brazil–Uruguay border that affected Rio Grande Do Sul.
- Bijli (2009) – a cyclonic storm that struck Bangladesh.
- Bilis

- 2000 – an intense typhoon that struck Taiwan and China, killing 71 people.
- 2006† – a tropical storm that caused widespread flooding across China, killing 859 people.

- Bill

- 1981 – a typhoon that formed east-southeast of Marcus Island; did not make landfall.
- 1984 – a typhoon that looped southeastward while just east of Luzon, and looped again to the southwest.
- 1988 – a tropical storm that struck China.
- 1997 – a hurricane that threatened Bermuda, but passed the island without incident.
- 2003 – a tropical storm that made landfall west of New Orleans, killing four and causing $50 million in damages.
- 2009 – a large Category 4 hurricane that passed Bermuda and grazed Nova Scotia before striking Newfoundland as a tropical storm.
- 2015 – a tropical storm that made landfall in southeastern Texas causing minimal damage.
- 2021 – short lived tropical storm which remained in the open ocean.

- Billie

- 1950 – a typhoon northeast of the Marianas Islands.
- 1955 – a typhoon that struck southern China.
- 1959 – a typhoon that struck southeastern China and South Korea, where the sudden rainfall led to a stampede of 70,000 people out of a stadium that killed 68 people.
- 1961 – a typhoon that passed east of Japan.
- 1964 – a tropical storm that struck the Philippines and Vietnam.
- 1967 – a typhoon that moved across Japan, killing 347 people.
- 1970 – a typhoon that struck Korea.
- 1973 – a typhoon that later struck northeastern China as tropical depression.
- 1976 – a typhoon that struck Taiwan and China.

- Billy

- 1986 – a tropical cyclone that struck Western Australia.
- 1998 – a tropical cyclone that struck Western Australia.
- 2008 – a tropical cyclone that struck northwestern Australia twice.
- 2022 – a tropical cyclone in the Indian Ocean far off the coast of Western Australia.

- Binang

- 1965 – a strong typhoon which paralleled the coasts of Philippines and Japan but did not impact land.
- 1981 – a weak tropical storm that stayed at sea.
- 1993 – a short-lived tropical disturbance only recognized by PAGASA.

- Bindu (2001) – a tropical cyclone in the South-West Indian Ocean that passed near Rodrigues.
- Bing (1997) – a typhoon that passed east of Japan.
- Bingiza (2011) – a tropical cyclone that struck Madagascar.
- Bining

- 1965 – an early-season typhoon that impacted the Philippines.
- 1969 – short-lived early season disturbance that was only monitored by PAGASA.
- 1973 – strong typhoon which brushed the Philippine and Taiwanese coasts before striking northeast China.
- 1977 – another weak tropical depression that remained short-lived.
- 1981 – strong tropical storm which affected Hong Kong, the Philippines and Taiwan, producing moderate damage.
- 1985 – another powerful early-season typhoon that did not impact land.
- 1989 – a typhoon which crossed the Philippines and China, killing at least 104 people.
- 1993 – a weak system that made landfall in Mindanao, causing minimal damage.
- 1997 – a tropical storm which impacted the Philippines, claiming 53 lives and inflicting significant damage.

- Biparjoy (2023) – a long-lived, powerful tropical cyclone that formed over the east-central Arabian Sea and made landfall near the India-Pakistan border.
- Birenda (1999) – formerly Cyclone Damien in the Australian region, it was renamed upon entering the South-West Indian Ocean.
- Biring

- 1967 – a Category 3-equivalent typhoon before turning out sea
- 1972 – a Category 4-equivalent typhoon that killed 204 people and caused approximately $23 million in damages in the Philippines.
- 1976 – tropical depression.
- 1980 – tropical depression.
- 1974 – a Category 1-equivalent typhoon that affected Philippines, Taiwan and China.
- 1988 – killed six people in the Philippines.
- 1992 – a weak tropical storm that did not affect land.
- 1996 – weak tropical storm that made landfall in Philippines.
- 2000 – weak tropical storm that made landfall in Philippines as tropical depression.

- Bising

- 1966 – a tropical depression that was only recognized by PAGASA.
- 1970 – a tropical depression that was only recognized by PAGASA.
- 1974 – struck the Philippines and Vietnam.
- 1978 – struck southern Japan.
- 1982 – struck the Philippines.
- 1986 – did not make landfall.
- 1990 – struck Taiwan and China.
- 1994 – struck the Philippines.
- 1998 – struck Taiwan and China.
- 2005 – did not make landfall.
- 2009 – a tropical depression that was only recognized by PAGASA.
- 2013 – only recognized by JMA and PAGASA.
- 2017 – only recognized by JMA and PAGASA.
- 2021 – a long lived storm that approached and affected the Philippines as a Category 5 super typhoon before turning out to sea.
- 2025 – a rapidly intensified typhoon that struck Chiayi County, Taiwan as a Typhoon and Zhejiang, China.

- Blake (2020) – a tropical cyclone that struck northern Australia.
- Blanca

- 1966 – a hurricane that set a record for the farthest traveling storm that formed in the Eastern Pacific by traveling 4,300 miles.
- 1970 – a short-lived tropical storm in the eastern Pacific Ocean.
- 1974 – a tropical storm southwest of Mexico.
- 1979 – a tropical storm southwest of Mexico.
- 1985 – a major hurricane that paralleled the southwest Mexico coast before moving out to sea.
- 1991 – a tropical storm southwest of Mexico.
- 1997 – a tropical storm that formed near Mexico's southern coastline.
- 2003 – a tropical storm that stalled near Mexico's southwest coast.
- 2009 – a tropical storm southwest of Mexico that contributed to flooding in Mexico and California.
- 2015 – a Category 4 hurricane which made landfall in the Baja California Peninsula as a tropical storm, being the earliest storm on record to do so.
- 2021 – a tropical storm southwest of Mexico.

- Blanche

- August 1969 – a hurricane that brushed Atlantic Canada.
- October 1969 – a tropical cyclone in the South-West Indian Ocean that dissipated near Tanzania.
- 1975 – a hurricane that struck Nova Scotia.
- 1987 – a tropical cyclone in the Australian region.
- 2017 – a tropical cyclone that struck northern Australia.

- Blandine (1975) – a tropical storm that struck western Madagascar.
- Blas

- 1980 – a short-lived tropical storm southwest of Mexico.
- 1986 – a short-lived tropical storm southwest of Mexico.
- 1992 – a short-lived tropical storm southwest of Mexico.
- 1998 – a Category 4 hurricane that moved parallel to the Mexican coast; its outer bands affected the state of Michoacán.
- 2004 – a tropical storm southwest of Mexico.
- 2010 – a tropical storm southwest of Mexico.
- 2016 – a Category 4 hurricane that later brought rainfall to Hawaii.
- 2021 – affected the Balearic Archipelago, Sardinia and Corsica.
- 2022 – a minimal hurricane that brought heavy rainfall in Mexico.

- Blossom

- 1969 – formed southwest of Cocos Islands.
- 2025 – a weak tropical storm in the south-west Indian Ocean.

- Bob

- 1978† – affected Vanuatu and New Caledonia.
- 1979 – hit Louisiana, killing one and causing $20 million in damage; the first hurricane in the Atlantic to have a male name.
- 1980 – a tropical cyclone in the South Pacific Ocean.
- 1985 – crossed Florida as a tropical storm and made landfall again in South Carolina; caused 5 deaths and $20 million in damage.
- 1991† – a major hurricane that brushed North Carolina, then struck New England and the Canadian Maritimes, killing 18 and causing over $1½ billion in damage.

- Bobalahy (1984) – a tropical storm in the South-West Indian Ocean.
- Bobbie

- 1992 – a typhoon that struck Japan.
- 1994 – a tropical storm that brushed the Marianas Islands.

- Bobby

- 1984 – a cyclone in the Australian region.
- 1995† – a tropical cyclone that struck Western Australia.

- Bohale (2015) – a tropical storm in the South-West Indian Ocean.
- Bola (1988)† – a tropical cyclone that affected Vanuatu and later caused heavy damage in New Zealand as an extratropical cyclone.
- Bolaven

- 2000 – crossed the Ryūkyū Islands and brushed southern Japan.
- 2005 – hit the Philippines as a tropical storm.
- 2012 – typhoon that hit Korea and Okinawa.
- 2018 – a tropical storm that formed in late December, moved across the Philippines, and lasted into early January.
- 2023 – a violent typhoon which passed close to Guam and became a strong extratropical cyclone afterwards.

- Boldwin (2012) – a tropical storm in the South-West Indian Ocean.
- Boloetse (2006) – a tropical cyclone that struck Madagascar, killing 6 people.
- Bondo (2006) – a tropical cyclone that passed through the Seychelles and later struck Madagascar, killing 11 people.
- Bongani (2009) – a tropical storm that passed north of Madagascar and later moved through the Comoros.
- Bongoyo (2020) – meandered in the Indian Ocean as a severe tropical storm.
- Bongwe (2007) – a tropical storm in the South-West Indian Ocean .
- Bonita (1996) – a tropical cyclone in the South-West Indian Ocean that struck Madagascar and Mozambique, killing 42 people.
- Bonnie

- 1978 – a tropical storm that struck Vietnam
- 1980 – moved north over the central Atlantic Ocean.
- 1986 – a minimal hurricane that hit Beaumont-Port Arthur, Texas, causing light damage.
- 1992 – tracked eastward over the Atlantic, striking the Azores as a tropical storm, causing no significant damage.
- 1998 – struck Wilmington, North Carolina, at just under Category 3 strength on the Saffir–Simpson hurricane scale.
- 2002 – a cyclone in the Australian region that caused heavy rainfall and gusty winds in Timor and Sumba; flash flooding in Sumba killed 19 people.
- 2004 – struck the Florida Panhandle, and caused heavy rainfall along the East Coast of the United States.
- 2010 – a short lived tropical storm that struck the eastern Florida coast causing minimal damage.
- 2016 – a weak tropical storm that struck Charleston, South Carolina, as a tropical depression, degenerated into a post-tropical cyclone and later re-strengthened into a tropical storm once again over open waters.
- 2022 – made landfall in Nicaragua as a tropical storm, crossed over intact into the eastern Pacific Ocean, where it became a Category 3 hurricane.

- Bonny

- 1960 – a tropical storm off the southwest coast of Mexico.
- 1968 – a tropical storm off the southwest coast of Mexico.
- 1972 – a tropical storm near Mexico's Baja California peninsula
- 1976 – a minimal hurricane off Mexico's southwest coast.

- Bopha

- 2000 – an erratically moving system that eventually affected the Philippines.
- 2006 – caused minor impact on Taiwan.
- 2012† – a very powerful late-season tropical cyclone which formed unusually close to the equator and killed 1,900 people in the Philippines.

- Boris

- 1984 – a Category 1 hurricane with no impacts on land that lasted from May 28 to June 18, a total of 21 days, one of the longest lasting hurricanes on record, and one of the longest-lived storms on record for the East Pacific.
- 1990 – a Category 1 hurricane whose outer rainbands produced moderate rain in several Mexican states.
- 1996 – a Category 1 hurricane that made landfall in southern Mexico causing heavy flooding that resulted in ten fatalities.
- 2002 – a moderate tropical storm that dumped heavy rains on sections of the Mexican coast.
- 2008 – a Category 1 hurricane with no impacts on land.
- 2014 – a weak tropical storm that struck southern Mexico in early June.
- 2020 – a weak tropical storm that moved into the Central Pacific without affecting land.
- 2026 – a large but short-lived tropical storm that quickly made landfall on the Mexican coast.

- Bouchra (2018) – a tropical storm in the south-west Indian Ocean.
- Boura (2002) – a tropical cyclone in the South Pacific Ocean.
- Bransby (2016) – a subtropical cyclone in the south-west Indian Ocean south of Madagascar.
- Bravo

- 1972 – a Category 2 hurricane which began its life as a subtropical system named Bravo; developed north-northeast of Bermuda but did not make landfall.
- 1973 – a Category 1 hurricane that caused a little damage while existing and slowly developing into an subtropical depression.

- Brenda

- 1955 – a strong Tropical Storm that made landfall in Louisiana and persisted into Eastern Texas.
- 1960 – a high end Tropical Storm that made 4 landfalls in Florida and the East Coast.
- 1964 – a tropical storm that passed near Bermuda.
- 1965 – a weak tropical disturbance northeast of Madagascar.
- January 1968 – a tropical cyclone in the South Pacific Ocean.
- June 1968 – a hurricane that originated over Florida and moved across the Atlantic.
- 1973 – a hurricane that impacted the Bay of Campeche.
- 1978 – a tropical cyclone northwest of Australia.
- 1985 – a typhoon that passed near Taiwan and South Korea.
- 1989 – a typhoon that struck the Philippines and China.

- Brendan

- 1991 – a tropical storm that struck the Philippines and China.
- 1994 – a tropical storm that struck South Korea.

- Bret

- 1981 – made landfall in southern Maryland.
- 1987 – short-lived storm, remained in the eastern Atlantic Ocean.
- 1993 – passed over Venezuela, killing 184 people.
- 1999 – strong Category 4 hurricane that hit south Texas, although damage was minimized as it hit a sparsely populated area.
- 2005 – short-lived storm, made landfall near Tuxpan, Veracruz, Mexico.
- 2011 – strong tropical storm, threatened the Bahamas before turning away.
- 2017 – formed southeast of Trinidad and affected portions of the southern Windward Islands and the Paria Peninsula of Venezuela.
- 2023 – formed east of Barbados and affected portions of the Lesser Antilles.

- Brian

- 1980 – a tropical cyclone northwest of Australia.
- 1989 – a typhoon that killed 31 on China's Hainan island.
- 1992 – a typhoon that affected Guam two months after a damaging strike by Typhoon Omar.
- 1995 – a tropical storm over the open western Pacific.

- Bridget

- 1967 – a tropical storm near Mexico's southwest coast.
- 1969 – a tropical cyclone in the Australian basin.
- 1971 – one of the worst hurricanes on record in Acapulco, killed 17 people.
- 1975 – a tropical storm off Mexico's southwest coast.

- Brigitta (1977) – a tropical storm that struck northern Madagascar.
- Brigitte (1960) – a tropical depression in the south-west Indian Ocean.
- Bronwyn (1972) – a tropical cyclone that struck Queensland.
- Bruce (2013) – a powerful tropical cyclone in the southern Indian Ocean.
- Bruno (1982) – a tropical cyclone that struck Western Australia.
- Bryna (1991) – a tropical storm that struck Madagascar twice.
- Bualoi

- 2019 – a Category 5 typhoon that brought floods over Japan.
- 2025† – a deadly storm that brushed the Philippines, then made landfall in Vietnam as a Category 2 typhoon.

- Bud

- 1978 – a tropical storm southwest of Mexico.
- 1982 – a weak, short-lived tropical storm south of Mexico.
- 1988 – a tropical storm that dissipated near the south Mexican coastline.
- 1994 – a weak, short-lived tropical storm southwest of Mexico.
- 2000 – paralleled the southwest coast of Mexico.
- 2006 – a Category 3 hurricane southwest of Mexico.
- 2012 – a Category 3 hurricane that approached Western Mexico.
- 2018 – a Category 4 hurricane that brushed the Baja California Peninsula as a tropical storm.
- 2024 – a moderate tropical storm, did not affect land..

- Bulbul (2019) – a very severe cyclonic storm that struck the Indian state of West Bengal, killing 41 people.
- Bune (2011) – a tropical cyclone that affected Fiji.
- Burevi (2020) – a tropical cyclone that affected Sri Lanka and Southern India.
- Butchoy

- 2004 – approached the Philippines.
- 2008 – a violent typhoon that affected Philippines and Japan since July 2008 and killed 4 people.
- 2012 – a powerful tropical cyclone which impacted Southern Japan in June 2012.
- 2016 – the third most intense tropical cyclone that impacted Taiwan and East China, with 86 confirmed fatalities.
- 2020 – a storm made landfall in the Philippines and South China in June 2020.
- 2024 – a severe tropical storm that made landfall in Hainan and Vietnam.

== See also ==
- Tropical cyclone
- Tropical cyclone naming
- European windstorm names
- Atlantic hurricane season
- List of Pacific hurricane seasons
- South Atlantic tropical cyclone
