= List of storms named Bebeng =

The name Bebeng has been used for twelve tropical cyclones in the Philippines by PAGASA and its predecessor, the Philippine Weather Bureau, in the Western Pacific.

- Tropical Storm Rose (1963) (T6303, 10W, Bebeng)
- Typhoon Sally (1967) (T6702, 02W, Bebeng)
- Tropical Storm Thelma (1971) (T7102, 02W, Bebeng)
- Typhoon Nina (1975) (T7503, 04W, Bebeng), struck China and caused the failure of the Banqiao Dam, eventually killing 26,000–200,000 people
- Typhoon Cecil (1979) (T7903, 03W, Bebeng), struck the Philippines
- Typhoon Vera (1983) (T8303, 03W, Bebeng), struck the Philippines
- Typhoon Sperry (1987) (T8704, 04W, Bebeng)
- Tropical Storm Vanessa (1991) (T9103, 03W, Bebeng), struck the Philippines
- Typhoon Gary (1995) (T9504, 07W, Bebeng), struck China
- Tropical Depression Iris (1999) (02W, Bebeng), remained in the open ocean

Preceded by Auring	Pacific typhoon season names Bebeng	Succeeded by Karing

- Typhoon Man-yi (2007) (T0704, 04W, Bebeng), struck Japan
- Tropical Storm Aere (2011) (T1101, 03W, Bebeng), struck the Philippines

The name Bebeng was retired by the PAGASA after the 2011 typhoon season and replaced by Betty.
