= List of storms named Bess =

The name Bess has been used for one tropical cyclone in the Atlantic Ocean, and ten tropical cyclones in the western Pacific.

Bess was used for one tropical cyclone in the Atlantic:

- Tropical Storm Bess (1978), hit Nautla, Mexico

Bess was used for ten tropical cyclones in the Western Pacific:

- Typhoon Bess (1952) (T5221)
- Typhoon Bess (1957) (T5710), hit southern Japan
- Typhoon Bess (1960) (T6014, 30W)
- Typhoon Bess (1963) (T6309, 20W), Category 4 super typhoon; hit southern Japan
- Typhoon Bess (1965) (T6528, 34W), Category 5 super typhoon
- Typhoon Bess (1968) (T6814, 19W)
- Typhoon Bess (1971) (T7128, 30W, Yayang), Category 5 super typhoon; struck Taiwan and China
- Typhoon Bess (1974) (T7423, 27W, Susang), hit Hainan Island and the northern Philippines
- Typhoon Bess (1979) (T7902, 02W, Auring)
- Typhoon Bess (1982) (T8210, 11W), Category 5 super typhoon; hit southern Japan and caused 59 deaths

The name Bess was retired after the 1974 season, and replaced by Bonnie. However, when the tropical cyclone naming lists changed in 1979, Bess was re-included. The name Bess was re-retired after the 1982 season, and replaced by Brenda.
