= Tropical Storm Aere (2011) =

Pacific tropical storm in 2011

Tropical Storm Aere (Bebeng)
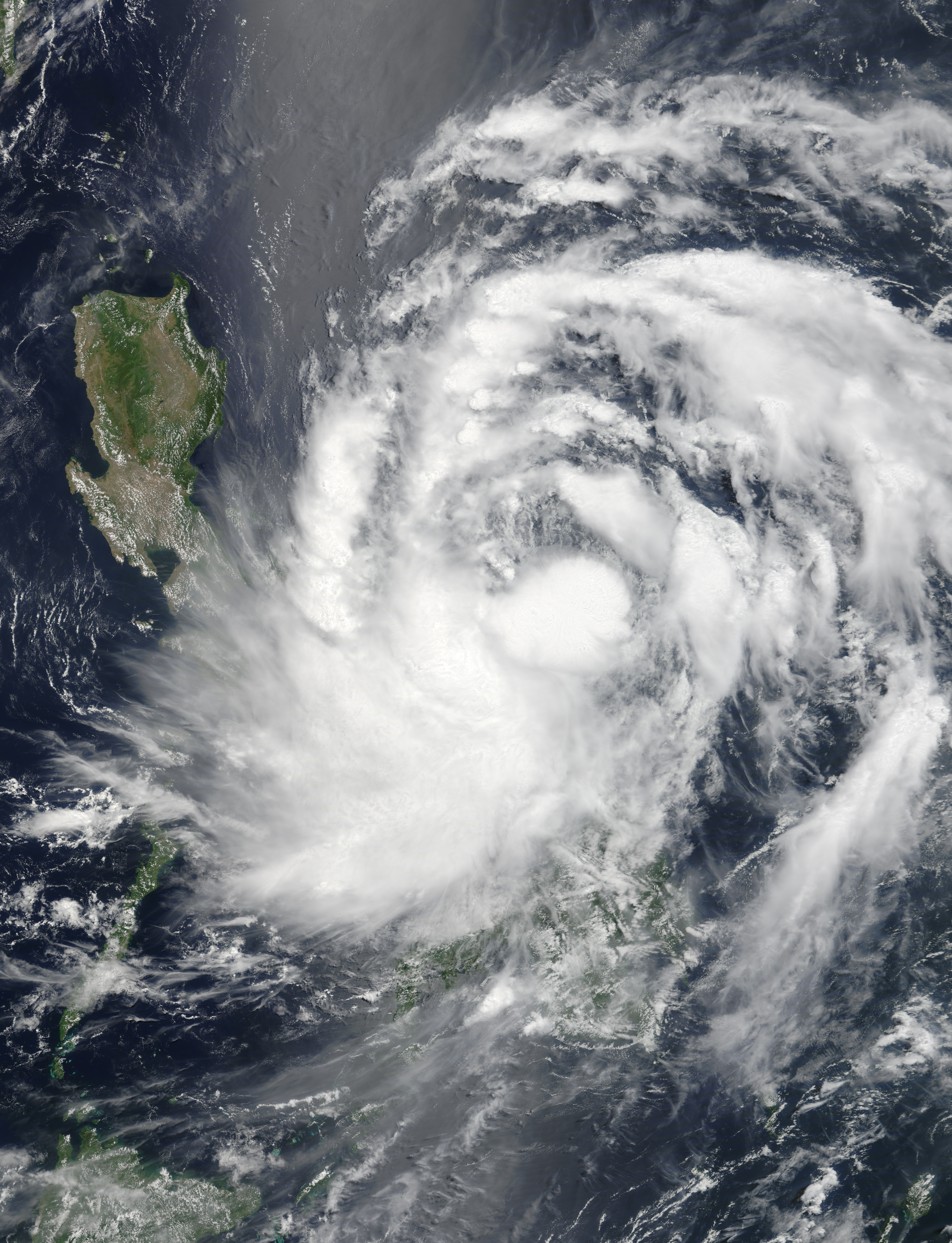
- Aere shortly before being named on 7 May

Meteorological history
- Formed: 5 May 2011
- Extratropical: 12 May 2011
- Dissipated: 15 May 2011

Tropical storm
- 10-minute sustained (JMA)
- Highest winds: 75 km/h (45 mph)
- Lowest pressure: 992 hPa (mbar); 29.29 inHg

Tropical storm
- 1-minute sustained (SSHWS/JTWC)
- Highest winds: 95 km/h (60 mph)
- Lowest pressure: 985 hPa (mbar); 29.09 inHg

Overall effects
- Fatalities: 44 direct, 4 indirect
- Damage: $34.4 million (2011 USD)
- Areas affected: Philippines, Japan
- IBTrACS
- Part of the 2011 Pacific typhoon season

Tropical Storm Aere, (Note: The name Aere (Marshallese: aere, [æ.jɛ.rˠɛj]) was contributed by the United States and means storm in Marshallese.) known in the Philippines as Tropical Storm Bebeng, was a mild tropical storm that affected eastern Philippines and southern Japan in early-May 2011. It was the first named storm of the 2011 Pacific typhoon season.

In the Philippines, Aere brought very heavy rainfall triggering landslides and floods knocking out power in several areas across Luzon. More than 50 flights were canceled or diverted because of the bad weather conditions and President Benigno Aquino III delayed his flight home from a summit in Indonesia by a day. The coastguards have stopped smaller boats from leaving ports in Catanduanes and surrounding areas, leaving 1,379 people stranded. More than 7,200 hectares (17,800 acres - 27 square miles) of rice, corn and high-value crops costing more than 118 million pesos ($2.7 million) were destroyed or damaged. At least 35 people have been killed and two more are missing as a result of Aere. Agricultural losses are estimated at PHP1.37 billion (US$31.7 million).

== Meteorological history ==
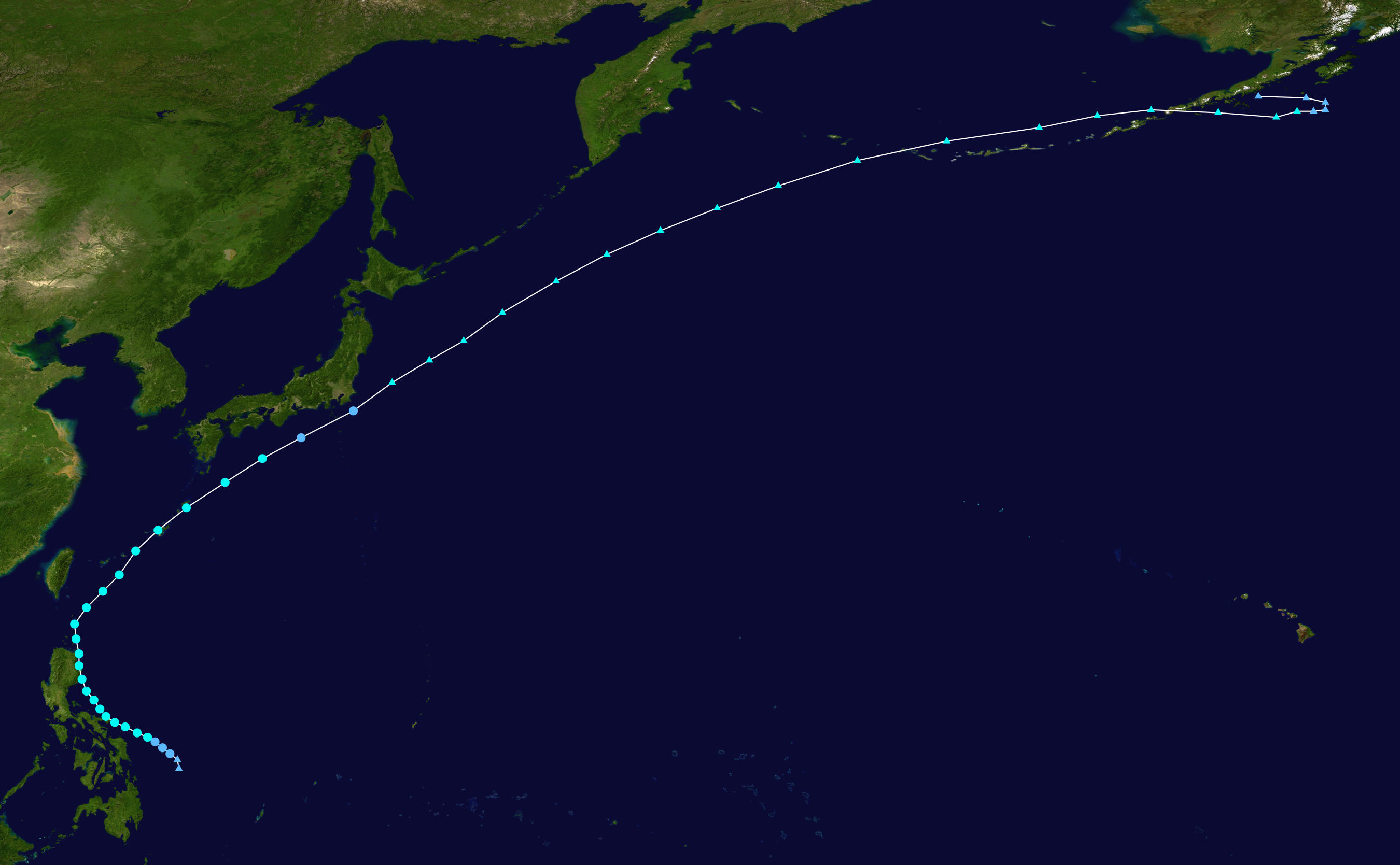
Map plotting the storm's track and intensity, according to the Saffir–Simpson scale Map key Saffir–Simpson scale Tropical depression (≤38 mph, ≤62 km/h) Tropical storm (39–73 mph, 63–118 km/h) Category 1 (74–95 mph, 119–153 km/h) Category 2 (96–110 mph, 154–177 km/h) Category 3 (111–129 mph, 178–208 km/h) Category 4 (130–156 mph, 209–251 km/h) Category 5 (≥157 mph, ≥252 km/h) Unknown Storm type Tropical cyclone Subtropical cyclone Extratropical cyclone, remnant low, tropical disturbance, or monsoon depression

On 3 May, the JTWC started to monitor a tropical disturbance that had developed within a monsoon trough about 140 km (85 mi) to the west of Palau. At this time the disturbances low level circulation centre was weak and unorganized, while a minimal amount of deep convection was observed around the system. Over the next couple of days the depression gradually developed further before it was declared a tropical depression by the JMA and the JTWC during 6 May. In the same evening, PAGASA upgraded the low pressure into a tropical depression and assigned its local name 'Bebeng'. In the afternoon of 7 May, JMA upgraded the tropical depression to a tropical storm, and assigned the name 'Aere'. During the early morning of 12 May, the JMA downgraded Aere to a tropical depression while south of Kyushu Island.

== Preparations ==
=== Philippines ===
Almost immediately after the PAGASA started monitoring the system, the NDRRMC raised storm warning signal 1 over the areas of Luzon and Visayas. The Philippine National Police were directed to continuously report the events to the NDRRMC as it happened. The Department of Health also alerted all the hospitals in the storm prone regions and asked them to sat in continuous coordination with PAGASA. Soon, the PDRRMC initiated evacuations across the Albay province with a population of 63,964 residing in 152 Barangays already evacuated as a pre-emptive measure. Also, the Armed Forces of the Philippines (AFP) deployed several assault vehicles and military personnel to closely monitor the situation across the nation and to haul rice for relief operations.

=== Taiwan ===
Officials in Taiwan issued a sea warning and informed residents on the eastern and southern parts of the island-nation about the torrential rain that Aere may bring. The Central Weather Bureau in Taiwan warned all ships in the Bashi Channel off the southern coast to brace for the storm reporting that the heavy rain may hit eastern and southern Taiwan triggering landslides and flooding.

== Impact and aftermath ==
=== Philippines ===
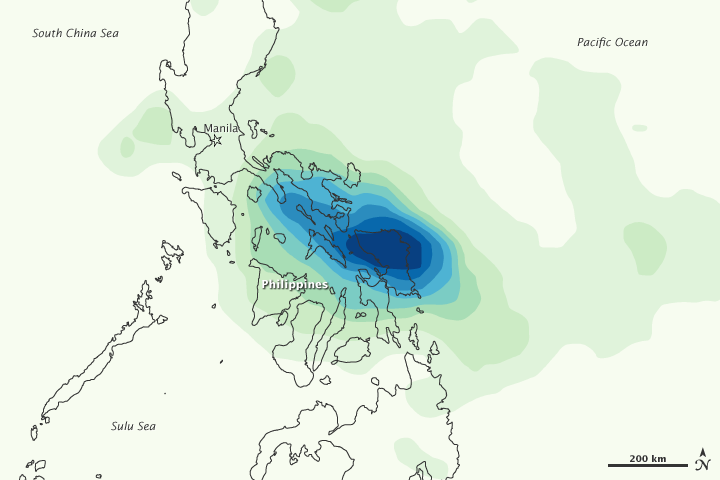
Rain of Tropical Storm Aere in the Bicol Region

Early on 8 May, Aere made landfall over Northern Catanduanes bringing very heavy rainfall across the nation. Around 210 passengers in the port of Lucena bound for Marinduque and 125 passengers in the port of Romblon bound for San Fernando, Romblon were stranded after their ships were cancelled due to heavy rains and rough sea conditions caused by the storm. More than 100,000 villagers fled from towns threatened by landslides. Aere triggered landslides and floods knocking out power in several areas across Luzon. Thousands were helped to flee from their farms around Mayon volcano in Albay province, which was threatened by landslides and heavy rains that have resulted in extensive flooding after the storm. A resident in Sorsogon province who was one of the victims expressed views on the storm, saying "The floods were so deep, they went past the head". More than 50 flights were canceled or diverted because of the bad weather conditions caused by Aere. President Benigno Aquino III delayed his flight home from a summit in Indonesia by a day due to the bad weather. The Disaster officials advised several villagers in the archipelago's agricultural regions situated in the north to stay prepared for landslides and flash floods after heavy rains poured by the storm. The coastguards have stopped smaller boats from leaving ports in Catanduanes and surrounding areas, leaving 1,379 people stranded after the NDRRMC's announcement that the security at coasts must be tightened. More than 7,200 hectares (17,800 acres - 27 square miles) of rice, corn and high-value crops costing more than 118 million pesos ($2.7 million) were destroyed or damaged. According to the National Disaster Risk Reduction and Management Council, at least 35 people have been killed and two more are missing as a result of Aere. Agricultural losses are estimated at PHP1.37 billion (US$31.7 million). Widespread flooding and landslides damaged homes, blocked off roads and severed communications. In Catarman, Northern Samar, 377.4 mm (14.86 in) of rain fell in just 24 hours, resulted in significant flash flooding.

=== Retirement ===
Following the storm's severe damages and impacts in the Philippines, in June 2012, the PAGASA announced that the name Bebeng would be retired and will be replaced by Betty, which was first used in the 2015 season.

== See also ==
- Other tropical cyclones named Aere
- Other tropical cyclones named Bebeng
- Typhoon Noul (2015)
- Typhoon Nida (2004)
- Typhoon Songda (2011)
- Typhoon Surigae (2021)
