= List of storms named Brian =

The name Brian has been used for three tropical cyclones in the Western Pacific Ocean and for one in the Australian region of the Southern Indian Ocean.

In the Western Pacific:

- Typhoon Brian (1989) (T8924, 27W), a destructive and deadly typhoon that made landfall on Hainan and later Vietnam
- Typhoon Brian (1992) (T9225, 25W), caused minor damage in Guam
- Tropical Storm Brian (1995) (T9522, 30W), not a threat to land

In the Australian region:

- Cyclone Brian (1980)
