= List of storms named Brenda =

The name Brenda has been used for nine tropical cyclones worldwide, including five in the Atlantic Ocean.

In the Atlantic:

- Tropical Storm Brenda (1955) – made landfall in Louisiana
- Tropical Storm Brenda (1960) – made multiple landfalls along the East Coast of the United States
- Tropical Storm Brenda (1964) – struck Bermuda
- Hurricane Brenda (1968) – Category 1 hurricane that traversed Florida as a depression
- Hurricane Brenda (1973) – Category 1 Hurricane that made landfall along the northern edge of the Yucatán Peninsula and then near Ciudad del Carmen, Mexico

In the Western Pacific Ocean:

- Typhoon Brenda (1985) (T8518, 22W, Pining) – Category 2 Typhoon that caused minor damages in Japan, Taiwan and South Korea
- Typhoon Brenda (1989) (T8903, 02W, Bining) – Category 1 Typhoon that made direct impacts to the Philippines and China

In the South-West Indian:

- Tropical Disturbance Brenda (1965) – did not threaten land

In the Australian region:

- Cyclone Brenda (1968)
