= List of storms named Betsy =

The name Betsy has been used for six tropical cyclones worldwide: three in the Atlantic Ocean, one in the Australian region, one in the South-West Indian Ocean, and one in the South Pacific Ocean.

In the Atlantic:

- Hurricane Betsy (1956) – Category 3 major hurricane, caused severe crop and structural damage in Guadeloupe and Puerto Rico
- Hurricane Betsy (1961) – Category 4 hurricane, did not make landfall
- Hurricane Betsy (1965) – Category 4 major hurricane, struck the Bahamas, Florida, and Louisiana

The name Betsy was retired after the 1965 season and replaced with Blanche.

In the Australian region:

- Tropical Cyclone Betsy (1968)

In the South-West Indian:

- Tropical Depression Betsy (1970)

In the South Pacific:

- Cyclone Betsy (1992) – Category 4 severe tropical cyclone, affected various South Pacific island nations
