= List of storms named Anggrek =

The name Anggrek has been used for two tropical cyclones in the Australian region of the Southern Hemisphere.

- Tropical Low Anggrek (2010) – off-season tropical low that affected the Cocos Islands.
- Cyclone Anggrek (2024) – a Category 4 tropical cyclone that churned in the open ocean.

Preceded by	TCWC Jakarta cyclone names Anggrek	Succeeded by Bakung
