= List of storms named Brendan =

The name Brendan has been used for two tropical cyclones in the northwest Pacific Ocean.

- Tropical Storm Brendan (1991) (T9108, 08W, Helming), struck the Philippines and China
- Tropical Storm Brendan (1994) (T9411, 14W, Oyang), struck South Korea and Japan
