= List of storms named Beti =

The name Beti has been used for two tropical cyclones in the South Pacific Ocean:

- Cyclone Beti (1984) – crossed over from the Australian region and struck the Loyalty Islands.
- Cyclone Beti (1995) – affected Australia, New Caledonia, New Zealand and Vanuatu, killing 2 people.

== See also ==
Storms with similar names

- Cyclone Beni (January 2003) – a Category 5 South Pacific severe tropical cyclone
- Cyclone Beni (November 2003) – a South-West Indian Ocean intense tropical cyclone
- Cyclone Bheki (2024) – another South-West Indian Ocean intense tropical cyclone
