= List of storms named Babs =

The name Babs has been used for four tropical cyclones in the northwest Pacific Ocean.

- Typhoon Babs (1951) (T5121)
- Typhoon Babs (1956) (T5609), struck Japan
- Tropical Storm Babs (1959) (T5917, 41W), struck Taiwan
- Typhoon Babs (1998) (T9811, 20W, Loleng), Category 4 super typhoon; struck the Philippines, resulting in 156 deaths and heavy flooding
