= List of storms named Beatrice =

The name Beatrice has been used for three tropical cyclones worldwide, one in the Western Pacific Ocean, one in the South–West Indian Ocean, and one in the Australian Region.

In the Western Pacific:

- Tropical Storm Beatrice (1947) – did not affect land

In the South–West Indian:

- Cyclone Beatrice (1972) – formerly Australian Region Cyclone Ivy prior to crossing 80°E

In the Australian Region:

- Cyclone Beatrice (1959)
