= List of storms named Basiang =

The name Basiang has been used for three tropical cyclones in the Philippines by PAGASA in the Western Pacific:

- Typhoon Tilda (1964) (T6419, 29W, Basiang) – a relatively strong typhoon which brushed Taiwan, northern Philippines and southern China before eventually making landfall in Vietnam
- Tropical Storm Opal (1976) (T7625, 26W, Basiang) – a minimal tropical storm which stayed at sea
- Tropical Depression Basiang (1980) – a tropical depression that was only recognized by PAGASA and JMA

Preceded by Aring	Pacific typhoon season names Basiang	Succeeded by Kayang
