= List of storms named Bella =

The name Bella has been used for one tropical cyclone in the Australian region and two in the South-West Indian Ocean. Bella has also been used for one European windstorm.

In the Australian region:

- Cyclone Bella (1973) – a Category 1 tropical cyclone.

In the South-West Indian:

- Tropical Storm Bella (1966) – a moderate tropical storm.
- Cyclone Bella (1991) – an intense tropical cyclone that killed approximately half of the extant Rodrigues flying fox at the time.

In Europe:

- Storm Bella (2020) – caused most of the coast of Norway to experience a white Christmas.

== See also ==
Storms with similar names

- Cyclone Belal (2024) – a South-West Indian Ocean tropical cyclone that became the strongest to affect Réunion since Cyclone Firinga.
- Cyclone Bellamine (1996) – a South-West Indian Ocean tropical cyclone that originated in the Australian region as Cyclone Melanie.
- Hurricane Belle (1976) – an Atlantic hurricane that made landfall in Long Island and Connecticut.
- Cyclone Belna (2019) – a South-West Indian Ocean tropical cyclone that became the first to make landfall in northwestern Madagascar in five years.
