= List of storms named Ben =

The name Ben has been used for three tropical cyclones in the West Pacific Ocean:

- Tropical Storm Ben (1979) (T7924, 28W, Krising) – struck the Philippines
- Tropical Storm Ben (1983) (T8306, 07W) – approached Japan
- Typhoon Ben (1986) (T8617, 14W) – Category 4 typhoon; no landfall

== See also ==
Storms with similar names

- Cyclone Beni (January 2003) – a Category 5 South Pacific severe tropical cyclone
- Cyclone Beni (November 2003) – a South-West Indian Ocean intense tropical cyclone
- Storm Benjamin (2025) – a European windstorm
- Cyclone Bento (2004) – another South-West Indian Ocean intense tropical cyclone
