= List of storms named Barang =

The name Barang has been used to name four tropical cyclones in the Philippine Area of Responsibility in the West Pacific Ocean:

- Tropical Storm Ivy (1967) (T6739, 41W, Barang) – a short-lived tropical storm and dissipated east of the Philippines.
- Typhoon Elaine (1971) (T7131, 33W, Barang) – a category 3 typhoon made landfall Philippines and affected South China and Vietnam.
- Typhoon Abby (1979) (T7923, 27W, Barang) – a Category 3 typhoon that did not approach land.
- Tropical Storm Sperry (1983) (T8322, 23W, Barang) – a tropical storm that did not approach land.
