= List of storms named Belinda =

The name Belinda has been used for two tropical cyclones worldwide.

In the Southwest Indian Ocean:

- Cyclone Belinda (1967), a Category 1 tropical cyclone that remained at sea.

In the Australian region:

- Cyclone Belinda (1972), a Category 2 tropical cyclone that formed near Christmas Island.

== See also ==
- Cyclone Helinda (1997), a similar name used once in the Southwest Indian Ocean.
