= List of storms named Bakung =

The name Bakung has been used for two tropical cyclones in the Australian region.

- Cyclone Bakung (2014) – a strong tropical cyclone over the open Indian Ocean.
- Cyclone Bakung (2025) – a Category 4 severe tropical storm that stayed at sea.

Preceded by Anggrek	TCWC Jakarta cyclone names Bakung	Succeeded by Cempaka
