= List of storms named Bridget =

The name Bridget has been used for three tropical cyclones in the East Pacific Ocean and for one in the Australian region.

In the East Pacific:

- Tropical Storm Bridget (1967) – weakened as it approached the Mexican mainland
- Hurricane Bridget (1971) – Category 2 hurricane that paralleled the Mexican coastline just offshore before making landfall southeast of Manzanillo, Colima
- Tropical Storm Bridget (1975) – never came near land

In the Australian region:

- Cyclone Bridget (1969)

== See also ==
Storms with similar names

- Cyclone Berguitta (2017) – a South-West Indian Ocean tropical cyclone that affected Mauritius and Réunion
- Tropical Storm Brigitta (1976) – another South-West Indian Ocean tropical cyclone
