= List of storms named Bidang =

The name Bidang has been used to name five tropical cyclones in the Philippine Area of Responsibility in the West Pacific Ocean:

- Tropical Depression Bidang (1970) (36W, Bidang) – a tropical storm that affected in the Philippines.
- Typhoon Irma (1974) (T7430, 34W, Bidang) – a Category 4 typhoon that made landfall in the Philippines and South China.
- Tropical Depression Bidang (1978) (26W, Bidang) – a tropical depression formed nearby Yap Island.
- Tropical Storm Roger (1982) (T8225, 28W, Bidang) – a severe tropical storm that brushed the coast of eastern Philippines.
- Typhoon Norris (1986) (T8629, 26W, Bidang) – late-season typhoon which spanned two calendar years and struck the Philippines.
