= List of storms named Beta =

The name Beta has been used for two tropical cyclones in the Atlantic Ocean:

- Hurricane Beta (2005) – Category 3 hurricane that made landfall in Nicaragua
- Tropical Storm Beta (2020) – tropical storm that made landfall in Texas
