= List of storms named Bettina =

The name Bettina has been used for three tropical cyclones worldwide: one in the Australian region and two in the South-West Indian Ocean. Bettina has also been used for two European windstorms.

In the Australian region:

- Cyclone Bettina (1968) – a tropical cyclone in the Australian region.

In the South-West Indian:

- Tropical Storm Bettina (1981) – a tropical storm that struck Mozambique.
- Tropical Storm Bettina (1993) – a tropical storm in the south-west Indian Ocean.

In Europe:

- Storm Bettina (2022)
- Storm Bettina (2023)
