= List of storms named Blossom =

The name Blossom was used for one tropical cyclone in the Australian Region and one in the South-West Indian Ocean.

In the Australian Region:

- Cyclone Blossom (1969) – formed southwest of Cocos Islands.

In the South-West Indian:

- Tropical Storm Blossom (2025) – a weak tropical storm in the south-west Indian Ocean.
