= Hurricane Brenda (1973) =

Category 1 Atlantic hurricane in 1973

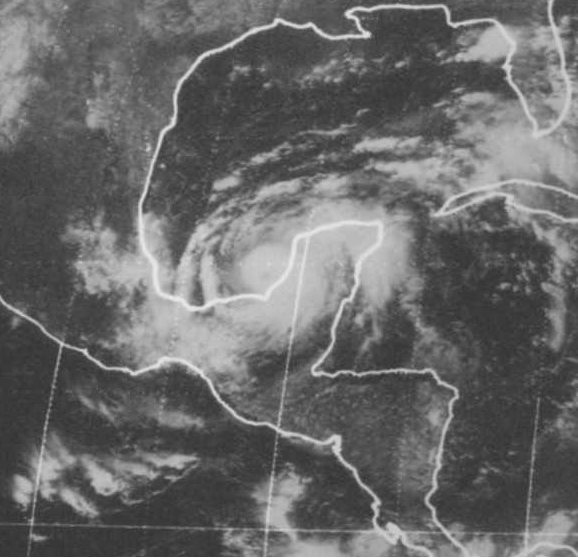
- Satellite image of Hurricane Brenda near Mexico

Meteorological history
- Formed: August 18, 1973
- Dissipated: August 22, 1973

Category 1 hurricane
- 1-minute sustained (SSHWS/NWS)
- Highest winds: 90 mph (150 km/h)
- Lowest pressure: 977 mbar (hPa); 28.85 inHg

Overall effects
- Fatalities: 10
- Areas affected: Cayman Islands, Mexico
- IBTrACS
- Part of the 1973 Atlantic hurricane season

Hurricane Brenda of August 1973 was the first tropical cyclone on record to make landfall in the Mexican state of Campeche. The tropical wave that spawned Brenda moved off the west coast of Africa on August 9, and uneventfully traversed the Atlantic. By August 18, an associated area of low pressure developed sufficient convective activity to be declared a tropical depression. Later that day, the system intensified into a tropical storm before moving inland over the Yucatan Peninsula. Brenda had moved back over water by August 21 and began to quickly intensify, with an eye forming later that day. The storm peaked as an upper-end Category 1 hurricane with winds of 90 mph (140 km/h) before making landfall in Campeche. The hurricane rapidly weakened after moving over land and dissipated the following day.

Brenda made two landfalls in Mexico: first in the Yucatan and later in Campeche. Little damage resulted from the storm throughout the Yucatan Peninsula. However, severe damage took place in areas near Brenda's second landfall. A total of 10 people were killed by the hurricane and over 2,000 more were left homeless. Flooding caused by Brenda was considered to be the worst in over 25 years in some places.

== Meteorological history ==
Map plotting the storm's track and intensity, according to the Saffir–Simpson scale Map key Saffir–Simpson scale Tropical depression (≤38 mph, ≤62 km/h) Tropical storm (39–73 mph, 63–118 km/h) Category 1 (74–95 mph, 119–153 km/h) Category 2 (96–110 mph, 154–177 km/h) Category 3 (111–129 mph, 178–208 km/h) Category 4 (130–156 mph, 209–251 km/h) Category 5 (≥157 mph, ≥252 km/h) Unknown Storm type Tropical cyclone Subtropical cyclone Extratropical cyclone, remnant low, tropical disturbance, or monsoon depression

Hurricane Brenda originated from a tropical wave that moved off the western coast of Africa on August 9; however, the initial wave quickly weakened upon entering the Atlantic Ocean. By August 13, the wave began to regenerate as it passed through the Lesser Antilles, producing scattered shower and thunderstorm activity. Several days later, convection associated with the system consolidated into a central, organized mass and on August 18, the system had become sufficiently organized to be declared a tropical depression. Early the next day, the depression strengthened into Tropical Storm Brenda following reports of gale-force winds from ships in the vicinity of the storm. Prior to its first landfall, Brenda suddenly intensified, with the central barometric pressure decreasing to 992 mbar (hPa; 29.29 inHg) and winds reached 65 mph (105 km/h). The storm moved inland roughly 30 mi (48 km) north of Cozumel at the northern edge of the Yucatan Peninsula on August 19.

Roughly 24 hours after landfall, the center of Brenda passed directly over the city of Mérida, Yucatán. By this time, a strong ridge over southern Texas and northern Mexico caused the storm to take an unusual southwest turn. Later on August 20, the center of Brenda moved into the Gulf of Mexico, specifically the Bay of Campeche. Once back over water, Brenda began to quickly intensify, attaining hurricane status later that day. The next day, a well-defined eye had developed and the storm attained its peak intensity as a high-end Category 1 hurricane with winds of 90 mph (140 km/h) and a minimum pressure of 977 mbar (hPa; 28.85 inHg). Around this time, the tropical storm force winds extended out 150 mi (240 km) to the north and 75 mi (121 km) to the south. The storm made landfall later that day near Ciudad del Carmen, Mexico at this intensity, becoming the first hurricane to strike the region on record. After moving inland, Brenda rapidly weakened to a depression by the morning of August 22 and dissipated later that day.

== Impact and aftermath ==
The tropical wave that spawned Brenda produced significant amounts of rainfall in the Cayman Islands as it became better organized. Upwards of 4 in (100 mm) was recorded on Grand Cayman on August 17. Offshore the Yucatan, a freighter with 25 crewman became trapped in the storm after its engines failed. The United States Coast Guard responded to the distress call sent out by the ship once Brenda had moved into the Gulf of Mexico on August 21.

Already suffering from severe flooding that killed at least 18 people and left 200,000 homeless, Hurricane Brenda worsened the situation with torrential rainfall and additional flooding. Following the damage wrought by Brenda, a large earthquake struck the region, hampering relief efforts and collapsing numerous structures. Brenda caused a total of 10 deaths. Two of the fatalities occurred in Campeche after 80% of the city was flooded. Two more of these deaths occurred in the coastal city of Veracruz. This was considered to be the worst flooding in the city in over 25 years. According to officials, 452 homes and the local docks were destroyed in the region. An estimated 2,000 people were left homeless as a direct result of Brenda throughout Mexico.

== See also ==
- 1973 Atlantic hurricane season
- Other storms of the same name
