= List of storms named Bravo =

There have been two subtropical storms known as Bravo, which is second in the NATO phonetic alphabet:

- Hurricane Betty (1972), formed as Subtropical Storm Bravo.
- Hurricane Fran (1973), was also classified as Subtropical Storm Bravo before becoming tropical.
