= List of storms named Bianca =

The name Bianca has been used for two tropical cyclones and one extratropical cyclone worldwide.

In the Australian region:

- Cyclone Bianca (2011) – a severe tropical cyclone that dissipated before affecting land.
- Cyclone Bianca (2025) – a Category 4 severe tropical cyclone that did not affect land.

In Europe:

- Storm Bianca (2022) – a storm named by the Italian meteorological service.

== See also ==
- Hurricane Bianca, a 2016 comedy film
