= List of storms named Baker =

The name Baker was used for three tropical cyclones in the Atlantic Ocean.

- Hurricane Baker (1950), struck Leeward Islands, Puerto Rico, Hispaniola, Cuba, and Gulf Coast of the United States; caused $2,550,000 in damage (1950 US dollars) and one death
- Tropical Storm Baker (1951), no threat to land
- Hurricane Baker (1952), brushed southeastern Newfoundland, but caused no damage
