= Typhoon Sally (1967) =

Pacific typhoon in 1967

Typhoon Sally (Bebeng)
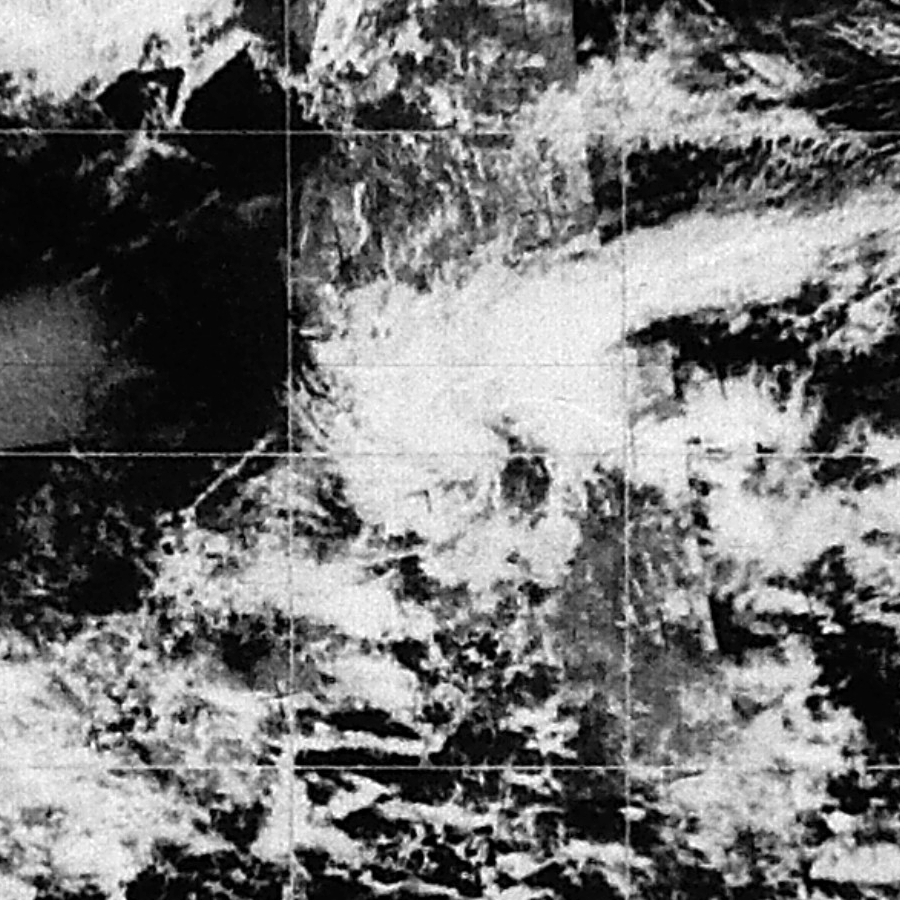
- Sally over the Philippines on March 2.

Meteorological history
- Formed: February 28, 1967
- Dissipated: March 6, 1967

Category 2-equivalent typhoon
- 1-minute sustained (SSHWS)
- Highest winds: 155 km/h (100 mph)
- Lowest pressure: 980 hPa (mbar); 28.94 inHg

Overall effects
- Fatalities: 4
- Injuries: 50+
- Damage: >$5 million (1967 USD)
- Areas affected: Palau, Philippines, Borneo
- Part of the 1967 Pacific typhoon season

Typhoon Sally, also known as Typhoon Bebeng in the Philippines, was a moderate typhoon which impacted Palau and the Philippines during February and March 1967. The third tropical depression, first tropical storm, and first typhoon of the 1967 Pacific typhoon season, Sally originated from a tropical depression northeast of Papua New Guinea on February 28, which underwent slow development, not becoming a tropical storm until March 1. However, in the span of six hours that same day, Sally undergone rapid intensification, intensifying from a minimal tropical storm into a typhoon. Further intensification occurred, and on 00:00 UTC on March 2, Sally peaked as a Category 2-equivalent typhoon. Soon after, Sally weakened into a tropical storm, making landfall just north of Mindanao on March 3 as a high-end tropical storm. Rapid weakening occurred due to landfall, and it become a tropical depression prior to making its second landfall in Leyte the next day. As it began recurving southwards, it dissipated on March 6, near Borneo.

As Sally peaked in intensity, the island of Koror, which was around 180 nautical miles (330 km) east of the typhoon, suffered the brunt and was lashed by hurricane-force gusts, damaging around 80 percent of the island's buildings. Three people died and another 50 were injured in Palau. In total, Sally caused USD$5 million in damage for the island. In the Philippines, Sally caused one death and "considerable damage" to property.

== Meteorological history ==
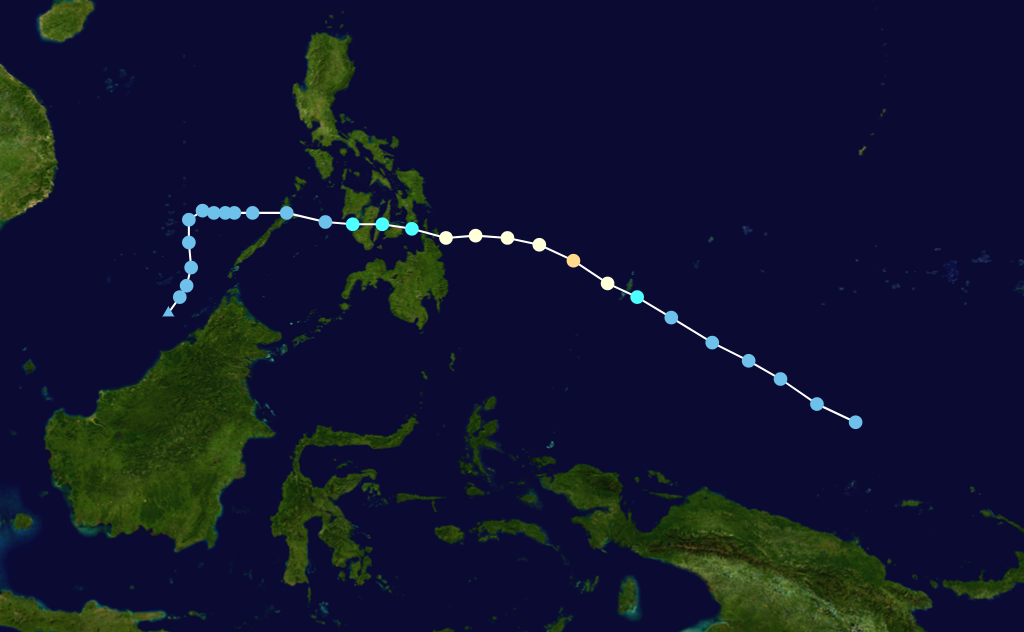
Map plotting the storm's track and intensity, according to the Saffir–Simpson scale Map key Saffir–Simpson scale Tropical depression (≤38 mph, ≤62 km/h) Tropical storm (39–73 mph, 63–118 km/h) Category 1 (74–95 mph, 119–153 km/h) Category 2 (96–110 mph, 154–177 km/h) Category 3 (111–129 mph, 178–208 km/h) Category 4 (130–156 mph, 209–251 km/h) Category 5 (≥157 mph, ≥252 km/h) Unknown Storm type Tropical cyclone Subtropical cyclone Extratropical cyclone, remnant low, tropical disturbance, or monsoon depression

On February 28, a tropical depression with a minimum pressure of 1,006 hPa (29.7 inHg) formed northeast of Manus Island in Papua New Guinea. Tracking northwestwards during the next few days, development was slow to occur. However, on 12:00 UTC on March 1, the depression intensified into a tropical storm, being named Sally by the Joint Typhoon Warning Center. However, in the span of six hours that same day, Sally undergone rapid intensification, intensifying from a minimal tropical storm into a minimal typhoon with sustained winds of 80 mph (130 km/h).

Further intensification occurred, and on 00:00 UTC on March 2, Sally peaked with sustained winds of 100 mph (155 km/h) and a minimum pressure of 980 hPa (29 inHg). Around that time, as Sally recurved to the west, it crossed into the Philippine Area of Responsibility, causing PAGASA to name it Bebeng. Soon after, Sally weakened into a tropical storm, making landfall just north of Mindanao 06:00 UTC on March 3 with sustained winds of 70 mph (110 km/h). Rapid weakening occurred due to landfall, and as it made its second landfall in Leyte at 06:00 UTC the next day, it weakened into a tropical depression. As it exited the Philippine Area of Responsibility on March 5, it began recurving southwards. As a result, it dissipated the next day, near Borneo.

== Impact ==
=== Micronesia ===
A 14-year-old girl in Koror and a woman and her two-year-old in Airai were killed to when their crumbling homes crushed them. Additionally, more than fifty suffered injuries and had to be sent to the district hospital. Most power lines and water systems were destroyed or shut down due to the typhoon's winds, which leveled most native homes and government facilities, with some buildings suffering 80 percent destruction. The village of Ngchesar was "demolished" while most homes in the island of Babeldaob were destroyed. Many roads were impassible due to Sally's winds, however, eyewitness reports indicated that rainfall didn't accompany these winds for a while.

Of the 935 homes in Palau, 773 sustained some damage. Of the 773 which sustained damage, 235 were destroyed. The island of Koror, which was around 180 nautical miles (330 km) east of the typhoon, suffered the brunt of Sally, being lashed by hurricane-force gusts which reached 85 mph (140 km/h). As a result, around 80 percent of the island's buildings were destroyed or damaged. One of these buildings was Koror Elementary School, which was destroyed by heavy winds. In total, Sally caused USD$5 million in damage for the island of Palau. Classroom shortages persisted in the country for several years after, prompting the government to begin building a school in 1969.

=== Philippines ===
In the Philippines, Sally, the first March typhoon since 1948 to make landfall in the nation, caused one death and "considerable damage" to property, with Surigao receiving peak winds of 75 mph (120 km/h).

== Aftermath ==
President Lyndon B. Johnson designated Babeldaob and Koror as disaster areas following the typhoon, on March 21. The American Red Cross and Palauan government instituted feeding programs for victims of the storm. Seabees were sent to Palau to aid in the reconstruction of the villages of Ngchesar and Babedaob. The government also instituted a 90-day moratorium on payments from Palauan businessmen to the Economic Development Loan Fund. Following the typhoon, an outbreak of colds and coughs occurred in Palau, straining local hospital's supplies. Clothing and food was donated from Saipan, Guam, and Yap to typhoon victims.
