= Tropical Storm Bavi (2015) =

Pacific tropical storm in 2015

Tropical Storm Bavi (Betty)
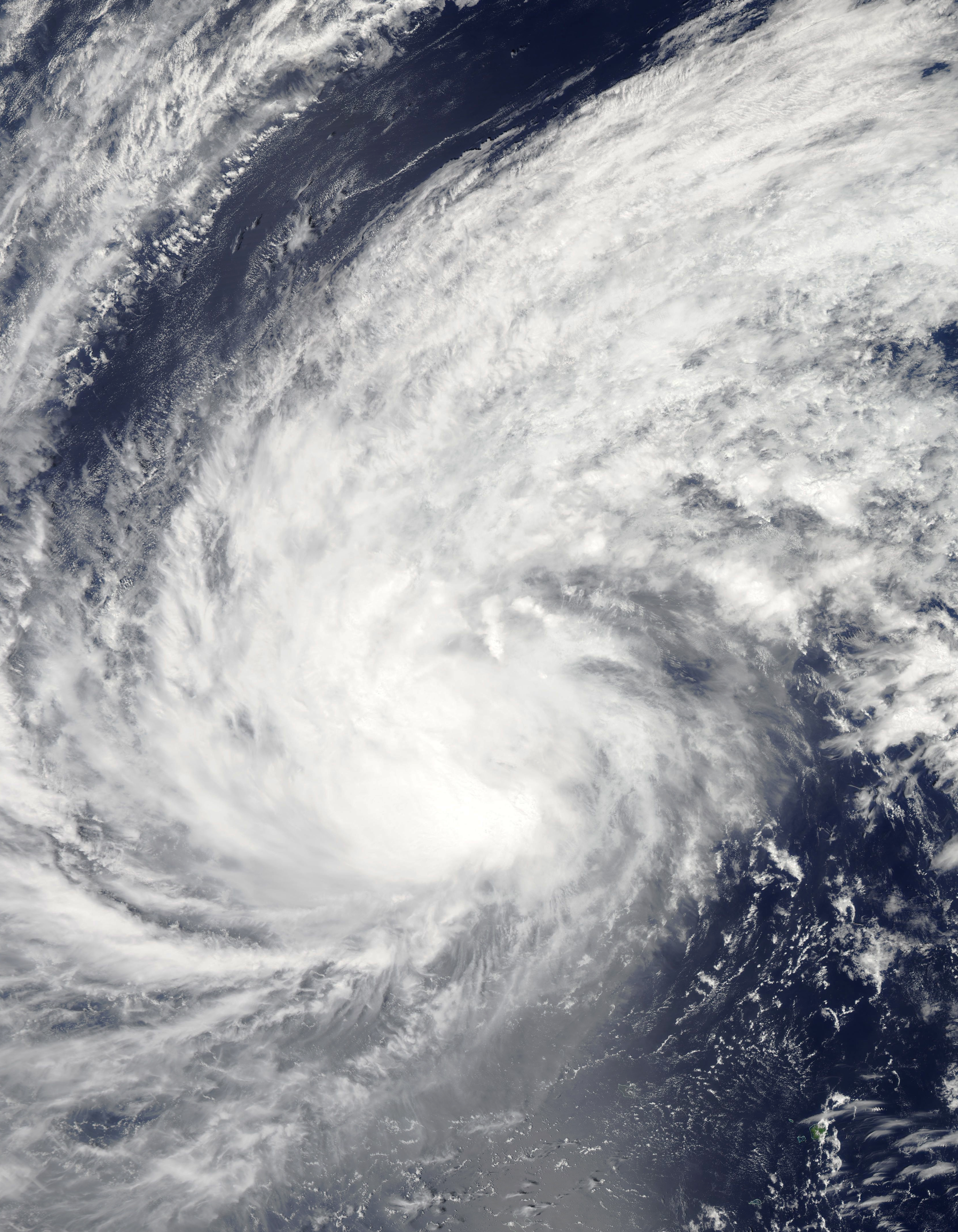
- Bavi at peak intensity on March 14

Meteorological history
- Formed: March 10, 2015
- Dissipated: March 21, 2015

Tropical storm
- 10-minute sustained (JMA)
- Highest winds: 85 km/h (50 mph)
- Lowest pressure: 990 hPa (mbar); 29.23 inHg

Tropical storm
- 1-minute sustained (SSHWS/JTWC)
- Highest winds: 95 km/h (60 mph)
- Lowest pressure: 985 hPa (mbar); 29.09 inHg

Overall effects
- Fatalities: 9 total
- Damage: $2.25 million (2015 USD)
- Areas affected: Kiribati; Marshall Islands; Mariana Islands; Philippines
- IBTrACS
- Part of the 2015 Pacific typhoon season

Tropical Storm Bavi, (Note: The name Bavi (Vietnamese: Ba Vì, [ʔɓaː˧˧ vi˨˩]) was contributed by Vietnam and refers to the Ba Vì mountain range in Vietnamese.) known in the Philippines as Tropical Storm Betty, was an early-season tropical storm in the 2015 Pacific typhoon season. The system influenced the trade winds over the Pacific Ocean and was partially responsible for one of the strongest trade wind reversals ever observed. The system was first noted as a tropical disturbance during March 8, 2015, while it was located to the southeast of Kwajalein Atoll in the Marshall Islands. Over the next couple of days the system moved north-westwards through the Marshall Islands, before it was classified as a tropical depression during March 10. The system subsequently moved north-westwards and continued to develop further, before it was classified as the third tropical storm of the 2015 Pacific typhoon season and named Bavi by the Japan Meteorological Agency (JMA) during March 11. After continuing its north-westwards movement, the system peaked as a tropical storm during March 14, before it started to weaken as it approached the Mariana Islands. The system subsequently passed over Guam during the next day, before continuing its west-northwestwards movement as it gradually weakened over the next few days. The system entered the Philippine area of responsibility, where it was named Betty by PAGASA during March 17 as the system weakened into a tropical depression. The system was subsequently last noted during March 21, as it dissipated over the Philippines.

Bavi and its precursor tropical disturbance impacted eastern Micronesia, with strong to gale-force winds of between 45–65 km/h (30–40 mph), reported on various atolls in the Marshall Islands. Considerable damage was reported on the islet of Ebeye, on the main atoll of Kwajalein, a small amount of tree damage was reported, while several old steel structures were made too dangerous to use. Overall damages in the Marshall Islands were estimated at US$2.1 million, while a fishing vessel and its crew of nine were reported missing during March 12. Bavi and its precursor also had severe impacts in Kiribati. After impacting Eastern Micronesia, Bavi approached the Mariana Islands, with its circulation passing over Guam during March 15, where it caused the highest waves to be recorded on the island in a decade. Bavi also impacted the Northern Mariana Islands of Rota, Tinian and Saipan, where power outages were reported and five houses were destroyed. Total property damages within the Mariana Islands were estimated at around US$150 thousand.

== Meteorological history ==
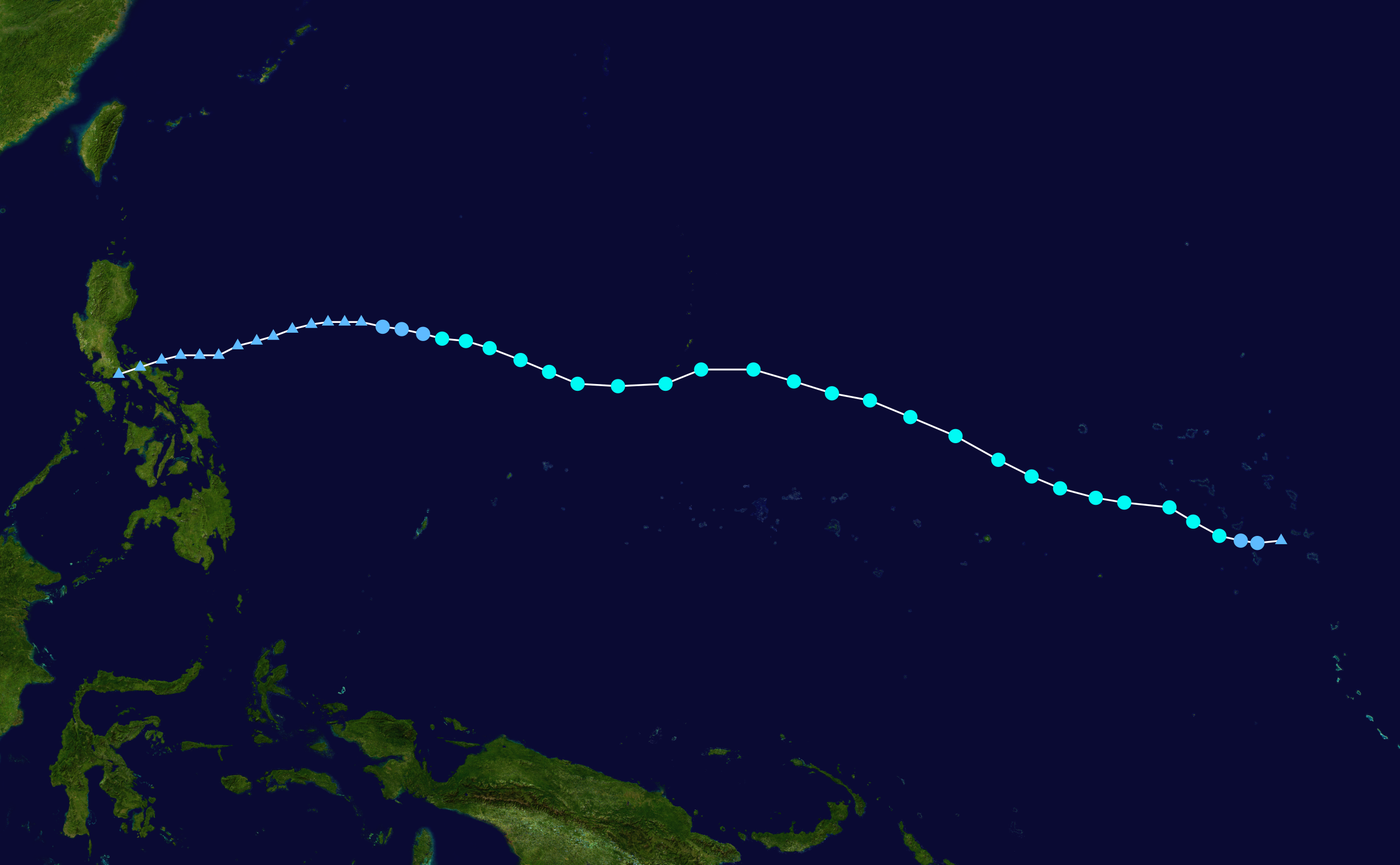
Map plotting the storm's track and intensity, according to the Saffir–Simpson scale Map key Saffir–Simpson scale Tropical depression (≤38 mph, ≤62 km/h) Tropical storm (39–73 mph, 63–118 km/h) Category 1 (74–95 mph, 119–153 km/h) Category 2 (96–110 mph, 154–177 km/h) Category 3 (111–129 mph, 178–208 km/h) Category 4 (130–156 mph, 209–251 km/h) Category 5 (≥157 mph, ≥252 km/h) Unknown Storm type Tropical cyclone Subtropical cyclone Extratropical cyclone, remnant low, tropical disturbance, or monsoon depression

During the opening days of March 2015, a major westerly wind burst occurred, which subsequently contributed to the development of the 2014-16 El Nino event and the development of twin tropical cyclones in the Pacific Ocean on both sides of the equator. The first tropical cyclone became Severe Tropical Cyclone Pam within the South Pacific Ocean and impacted various parts of Melanesia including the Solomon Islands and Vanuatu. The second tropical cyclone was first noted by the United States Joint Typhoon Warning Center (JTWC) as a tropical disturbance during March 8, while it was located about 500 km (310 mi) to the southeast of Kwajalein Atoll in the Marshall Islands. The disturbance consisted of a large area of atmospheric convection, which was starting to wrap into the system's developing low level circulation centre. The disturbance was also thought to be in a favourable environment for further development at this time, with low vertical wind shear and a good outflow towards the equator. Over the next couple of days the system moved north-westwards through the Marshall Islands and into a marginal environment for further development, with moderate vertical wind shear being partially offset by the system's outflow. During March 10, the Japan Meteorological Agency subsequently started monitoring the disturbance as a tropical depression, while it was located about 330 km (205 mi) to the northeast of Bairiki in Kiribati.

Over the next day, the system moved north-westwards and gradually developed further, before the JMA reported that the system had developed into a tropical storm and named it Bavi during March 11. Later that day as the system's low level circulation centre continued to consolidated and deep convection wrapped into it, the JTWC initiated advisories and designated the system as 03W. The system subsequently continued to gradually intensify as it moved westwards, around the southern periphery of a subtropical ridge of high pressure located to the northwest of the system. During March 14, the system peaked as a tropical storm with the JMA reporting 10-minute sustained winds of 85 km/h (50 mph), while the JTWC reported 1-minute sustained winds of 95 km/h (60 mph). By this time the system was approaching the Mariana islands and had started to weaken, with system's low level circulation becoming partially exposed and displaced from the atmospheric convection. As a result of this the system's low level circulation passed over Guam during March 15, while convection associated with the system passed over the Northern Mariana islands. Over the next couple of days the system moved westwards and continued to weaken, before it weakened into a tropical depression during March 17, as it moved into the Philippine area of responsibility where it was named Betty by PAGASA. The JTWC stopped monitoring Bavi during March 19, after the system had weakened into a tropical disturbance, however, the JMA continued to monitor the system as a tropical depression, until it dissipated within the Philippines, during March 21.

== Preparations and impact ==
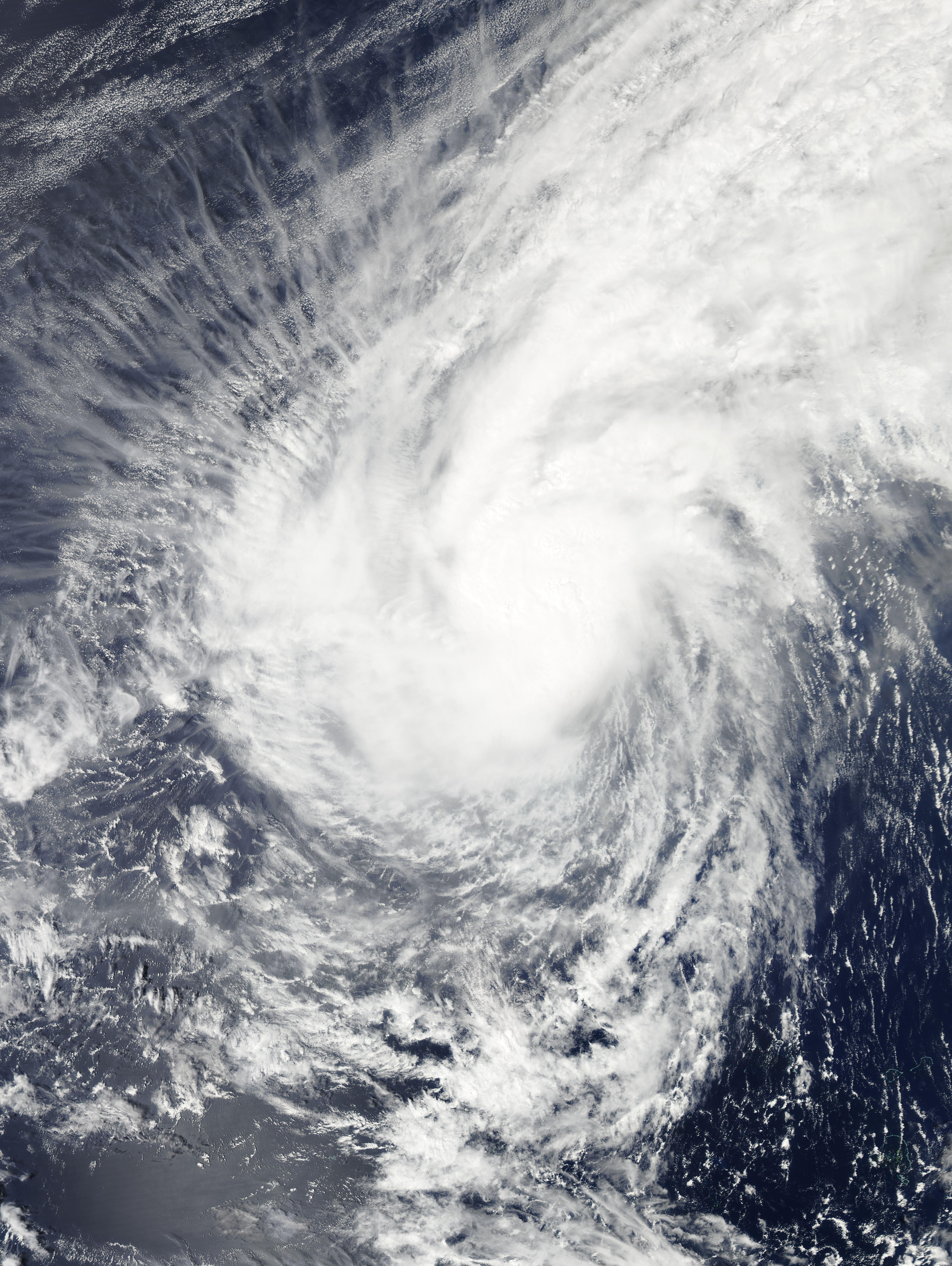
Tropical Storm Bavi near Mariana Islands on March 15

Tropical Storm Bavi and its precursor were reported to have caused severe impacts in Kiribati.

Tropical Storm Bavi impacted various atolls within Micronesia, while the system's large wind field generated large waves, which were problematic in the Marshall Islands and the Mariana islands. The system also influenced the Pacific trade winds and with Severe Tropical Cyclone Pam, caused one of the strongest trade wind reversals that had been observed on record.

Bavi and its precursor tropical disturbance impacted eastern Micronesia between March 9–13, with gusty winds and high seas reported throughout the Marshall Islands. A pressure gradient between Bavi and an area of high pressure, generated strong to gale-force winds of between 45–65 km/h (30–40 mph) on various atolls. As a result, various tropical storm watches and warnings were issued for parts of the Marshall Islands, including the coral atolls of Ujae and Ailinglaplap. On the 15 islands that make up the atoll of Ujae, a significant period of strong winds were reported, which lead to breadfruit trees being destroyed and several houses blown over. Across the Kwajalein Atoll, total damages amounted to over US$1 million, with considerable damage reported on the islet of Ebeye. On the main island of Kwajalein, a small amount of tree damage was reported, while several old steel structures were made too dangerous to use. At the missile defense test range on the island, a 3-day rainfall total of 10.65 in (271 mm) was reported between March 9–11. On the islet of Ebeye located about 3 km (1.9 mi) to the north of Kwajalein, high surf caused some coastal flooding while gale-force winds damaged structures with tin roofs and plywood walls. Bavis's large waves combined with the high tide caused flooding on various islets of the atoll of Majuro. Within the atoll a yacht struck a reef during March 10, while the fishing vessel Clearwater 2 and its crew of nine were reported missing during March 12, after they became overdue at their destination port. A search and rescue mission was subsequently launched with various good samaritan vessels and two aircraft from the United States Coast Guard and Navy helping to look for the vessel. The search effort subsequently found debris from the ship in various locations along the track taken by Bavi, including to the east of Majuro and southeast of Kwajalein. Total damages to property within the Marshall Islands were estimated at US$2.1 million, while the total crop damage was estimated at US$100 thousand.

After leaving Eastern Micronesia, Bavi continued to move westwardsand threatened to impact the Mariana Islands as a typhoon. As a result, the Guam Weather Forecast Office issued a typhoon watch and a tropical storm warning for Guam, Rota, Tinian and Saipan during March 13. The islands were also placed in Tropical Cyclone Condition of Readiness 1 by Governors Eddie Calvo, Eloy Inos and Rear Admiral Bette Bolivar. The Guam Waterworks Authority advised residents on the island stock up on water ahead of the system, in case Bavi disrupted the island's water service. United Airlines, Cape Air and United Express all cancelled flights that departed from Guam, while schools were shut on the island during March 15. However, as Bavi approached the islands, upper level wind shear caused the system to decouple and start to gradually weaken. Bavi's circulation subsequently passed over Guam during March 15, with winds on the island barely reaching gale force on the island. Within Guam, sporadic power outages and minor tree damage were reported, while waves on the uninhabited northeastern coast of Guam reached 20–30 ft (5–10 m) and were the highest waves recorded on the island in a decade. A band of showers associated with the system and a pressure gradient, between Bavi and an area of high pressure, brought winds of up to 105 km/h (65 mph) to Saipan and Tinian. As a result, several trees and power lines were brought down across the islands, which resulted in Saipan having sporadic power outages and temporarily losing all electric. Around 65 homes which were primarily constructed with wood and tin were affected by the winds, with 5 destroyed while a further 52 sustained some damage. The local Red Cross chapter subsequently provided tarpaulins, cleaning materials and over $25,000 in assistance to 252 people, while total property damages within the Mariana Islands were estimated at around US$150 thousand.

== See also ==
- Weather of 2015
- Tropical cyclones in 2015
- List of storms named Bavi
- List of storms named Betty
- Typhoon Dolphin (2008)
