= Tropical Storm Brendan (1991) =

Pacific severe tropical storm in 1991

Severe Tropical Storm Brendan
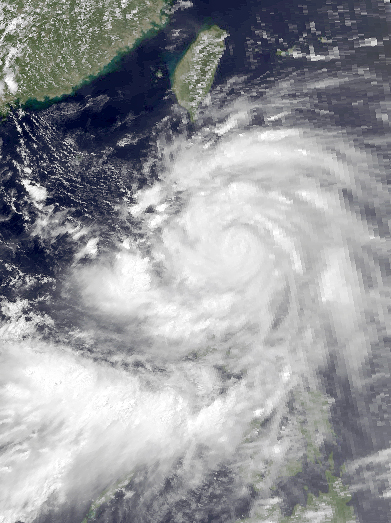
- Brendan before striking Luzon on July 22

Meteorological history
- Formed: July 19, 1991
- Dissipated: July 25, 1991

Severe tropical storm
- 10-minute sustained (JMA)
- Highest winds: 110 km/h (70 mph)
- Lowest pressure: 980 hPa (mbar); 28.94 inHg

Category 1-equivalent typhoon
- 1-minute sustained (SSHWS/JTWC)
- Highest winds: 140 km/h (85 mph)

Overall effects
- Fatalities: 34
- Missing: 2
- Damage: $253 million (1991 USD)
- Areas affected: Philippines, Taiwan, Macau, Hong Kong, China
- Part of the 1991 Pacific typhoon season

Severe Tropical Storm Brendan, also known in the Philippines as Tropical Storm Helming, was a third consecutive tropical cyclone to strike China in July 1991. A weak surface circulation developed near Carolina Islands in July 15. Tracking west-northwestward, the circulation organized into a tropical depression in July 19. The tropical depression intensified into Tropical Storm Brendan in July 21 when the depression approached Philippines. Brendan quickly intensified to reach the first peak intensity of 115 km/h (70 mph) when it made landfall in Luzon Philippines. (Note: All winds are in ten-minute sustained standards unless otherwise implied by stating the agency the winds were from.) After emerging in Luzon Strait as a strong tropical storm and continued to track west-northwestward, Brendan reached the secondary peak intensity of 105 km/h (65 mph) in July 23, before making landfall on Guangdong, China, 30 kilometres (19 mi) southwest of Macau in July 24. After making landfall, Brendan weakened and dissipated later that day.

Across the Philippines, heavy rain associated with Brendan combined with volcanic debris from Mount Pinatubo raised mudflows up to 5 metres (16 ft) high around the vicinity of volcano. Around 10,000 people were forced to evacuate and approximately 1400 houses were destroyed by the rising mudflow. Four deaths are recorded in the country. In Hong Kong, Brendan caused 17 injuries. These people were hit by glass pieces and objects that were blown away by the storm. Overall damages across Hong Kong was estimated to be HK$0.94 million, mostly from public utilities. In Macau, severe flooding are reported in low-lying areas. Two fishermen from China reported missing southwest of Macau after the storm capsized their boats. In Guangdong, the storm killed two people and injured four others. 64 houses were destroyed and 1,019 others were damaged. More than 78,000 hectares (190,000 acres) of farmland were affected. Total losses were estimated to be ¥1.32 billion (US$247 million). (Note: Currencies can be converted to United States Dollars using (New People's Currency) Yuan Measuring worth with an exchange rate of the year 1991.) In Guangxi, the storm killed 28 people and injured 189 others. About 2,100 houses were destroyed and 16,000 others are damaged. More than 16,000 hectares (40,000 acres) of farmland were flooded. Total losses were estimated to be ¥25 million ($4.68 million).

== Meteorological history ==
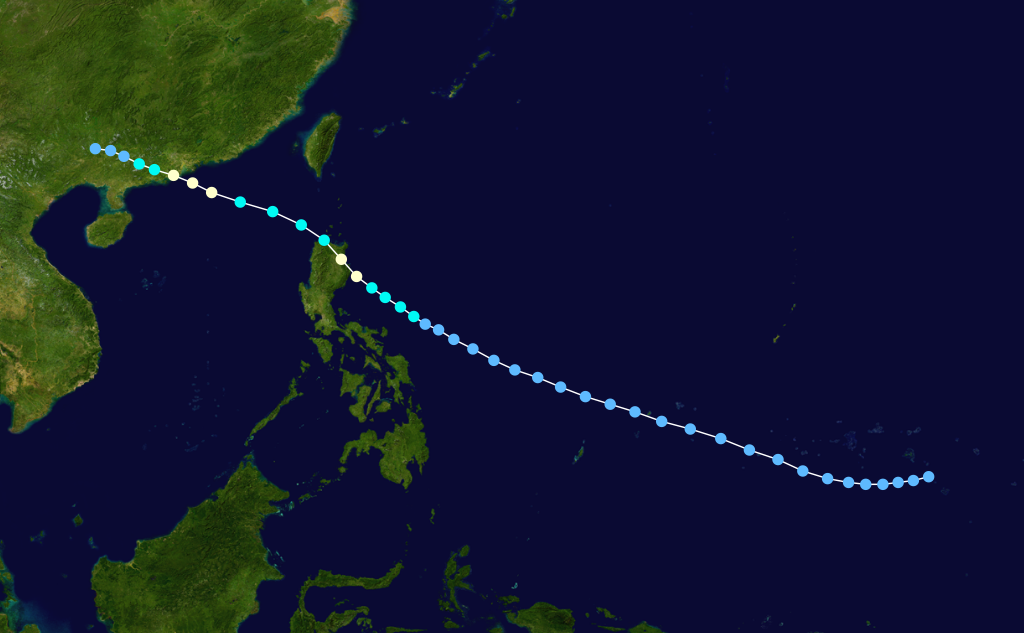
Map plotting the storm's track and intensity, according to the Saffir–Simpson scale Map key Saffir–Simpson scale Tropical depression (≤38 mph, ≤62 km/h) Tropical storm (39–73 mph, 63–118 km/h) Category 1 (74–95 mph, 119–153 km/h) Category 2 (96–110 mph, 154–177 km/h) Category 3 (111–129 mph, 178–208 km/h) Category 4 (130–156 mph, 209–251 km/h) Category 5 (≥157 mph, ≥252 km/h) Unknown Storm type Tropical cyclone Subtropical cyclone Extratropical cyclone, remnant low, tropical disturbance, or monsoon depression

Tropical Storm Brendan developed from a weak surface circulation which developed 130 km (80 mi) south-southwest of Chuuk in Carolina Islands on July 15. The circulation would track west-northwest for several days until it reached an area of increased upper-level divergence in the central Philippine Sea on July 19, leading JTWC to issue Tropical Cyclone Formation Alert at 18:00 UTC, when the system was located approximately 450 km (280 mi) east of Samar. Around the same time, JMA upgraded the system into a tropical depression. (Note: JMA is the official Regional Specialized Meteorological Center for the western Pacific Ocean.) However, due to diurnal fluctuations that affected the system's convection, JTWC reissued the TCFA at 18:00 UTC on August 20, 1991. Later that morning, satellite imagery showed significant organization within the system. Coupled with a low shear environment and warm sea surface temperatures, JTWC declared the system a tropical depression in the 00:00 UTC of August 21. As the depression continued to develop six hours later, based on a Dvorak intensity estimate of T2.5/65 km/h (40 mph), the JTWC upgraded the tropical depression into a tropical storm and was given the name Brendan. JMA also upgraded the depression into a tropical storm at the same time. (Note: Wind estimates from the JMA and most other basins throughout the world are sustained over 10 minutes, while estimates from the United States-based Joint Typhoon Warning Center are sustained over 1 minute. 10-minute winds are about 1.14 times the amount of 1-minute winds.)

== Impacts ==
=== Philippines ===
Across the Philippines, heavy rain associated with Brendan combined with volcanic debris from Mount Pinatubo raised mudflows up to 5 metres (16 ft) high around the vicinity of volcano. Around 10,000 people were forced to evacuate and approximately 1400 houses were destroyed by the rising mudflow. Four deaths are recorded in the country.

=== Hong Kong ===
In Hong Kong, Brendan caused 17 injuries. These people were hit by glass pieces and objects that were blown away by the storm. Overall damages across Hong Kong was estimated to be HK$0.94 million, mostly from public utilities.

=== Macau ===
In Macau, severe flooding are reported in low-lying areas. Two fishermen from China reported missing southwest of Macau after the storm capsized their boats.

=== Mainland China ===
In Guangdong, the storm killed two people and injured four others. 64 houses were destroyed and 1,019 others were damaged. More than 78,000 hectares (190,000 acres) of farmland were affected. Total losses were estimated to be ¥1.32 billion (US$247 million). In Guangxi, the storm killed 28 people and injured 189 others. About 2,100 houses were destroyed and 16,000 others are damaged. More than 16,000 hectares (40,000 acres) of farmland were flooded. Total losses were estimated to be ¥25 million ($4.68 million).

== See also ==
- Tropical Storm Nida (2016)
