= Typhoon Brian (1989) =

Pacific typhoon in 1989

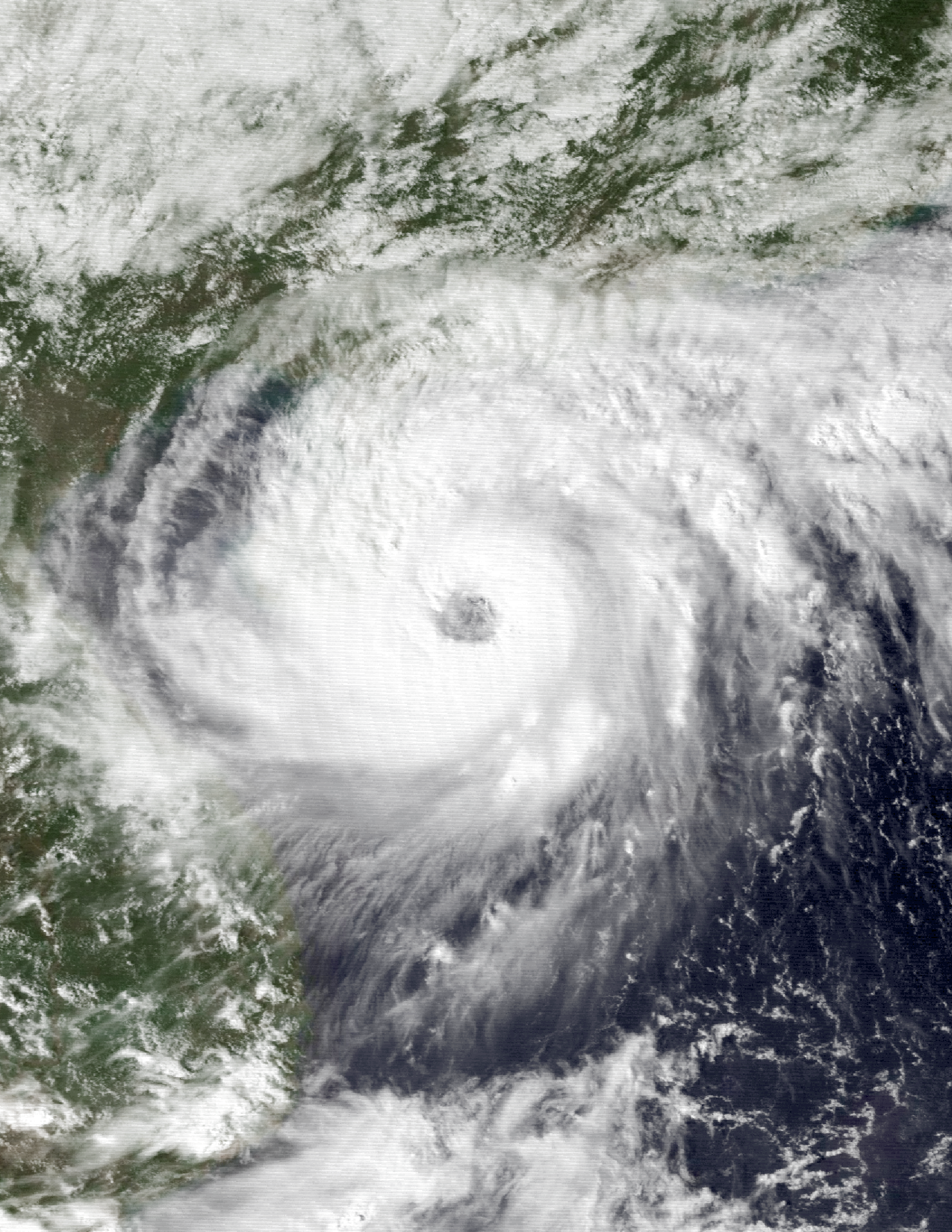
- Typhoon Brian on October 2, 1989

Meteorological history
- Formed: September 28, 1989
- Dissipated: October 4, 1989

Typhoon
- 10-minute sustained (JMA)
- Highest winds: 120 km/h (75 mph)
- Lowest pressure: 970 hPa (mbar); 28.64 inHg

Category 1-equivalent typhoon
- 1-minute sustained (SSHWS/JTWC)
- Highest winds: 150 km/h (90 mph)
- Lowest pressure: 963 hPa (mbar); 28.44 inHg

Overall effects
- Fatalities: At least 40 total
- Damage: $222 million (1989 USD)
- Areas affected: Hainan Island; Hong Kong; Vietnam
- IBTrACS
- Part of the 1989 Pacific typhoon season

Typhoon Brian was the first in a series of tropical cyclones to impact southern China and northern Vietnam in October 1989. Originating from an area of low pressure associated with a monsoon trough in late-September, Brian quickly organized into a tropical storm over the South China Sea on September 30. Tracking along a general west-southwest to westerly course, the storm attained typhoon status on October 1 before making landfall along the southern coast of Hainan Island the following day. Slight weakening occurred during Brian's brief passage of Hainan Island before the system entered the Gulf of Tonkin. The storm ultimately struck Vietnam on October 3 before dissipating the next day over Laos.

Across Hainan Island, Brian caused extensive damage to property and infrastructure. Nearly 185,000 homes were damaged or destroyed by the storm's high winds or flash flooding. Communications were severely disrupted as 2,800 km (1,700 mi) of power and telephone lines were downed. Brian killed 40 people and inflicted 837 million Renminbi (US$222 million) in damage throughout Hainan before impacting Vietnam and causing further damage. Significant losses were reported in Vietnam as well; however, the rapid succession of Brian and two other typhoons made it difficult to differentiate the losses caused by each storm.

== Meteorological history ==
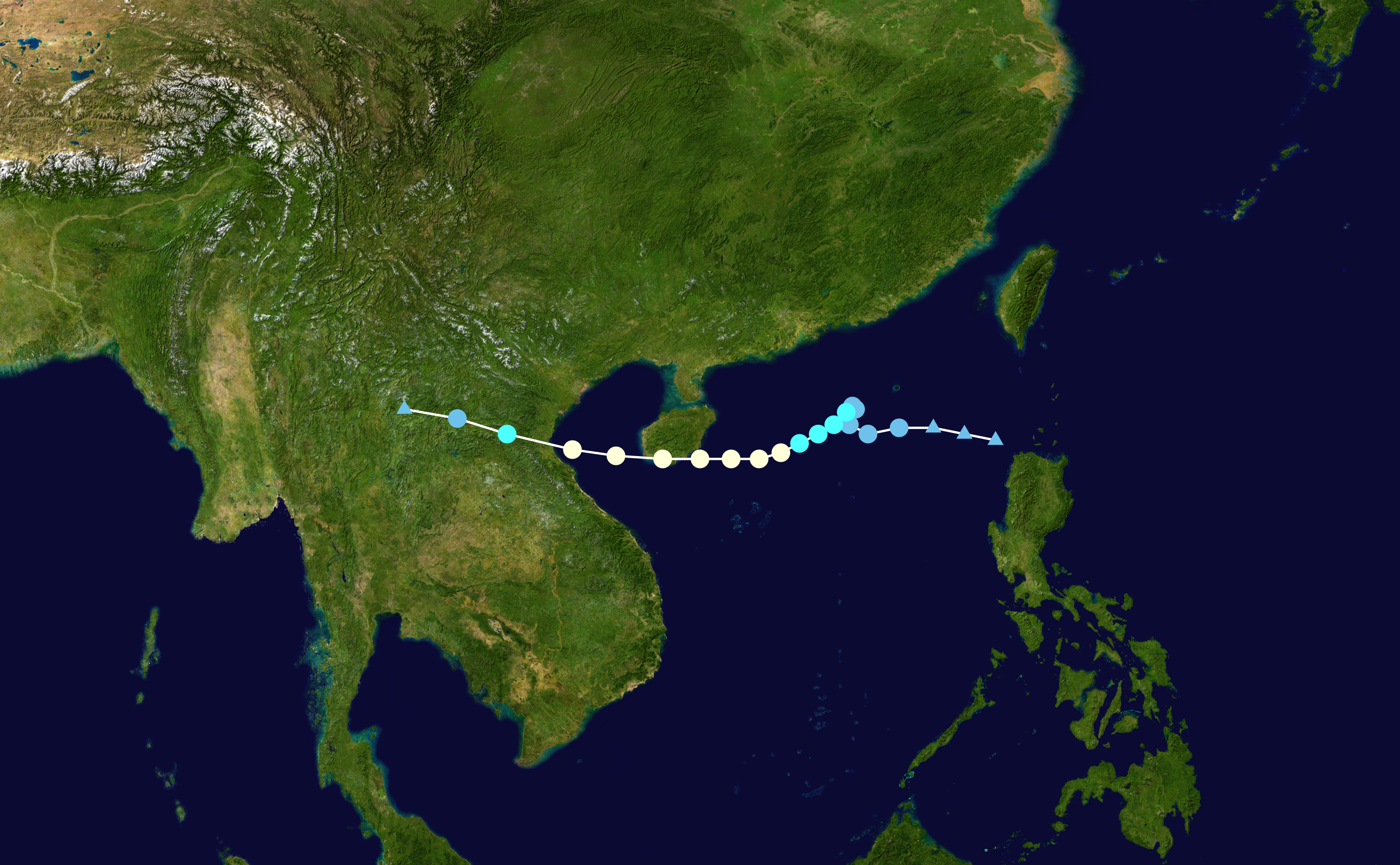
Map plotting the storm's track and intensity, according to the Saffir–Simpson scale Map key Saffir–Simpson scale Tropical depression (≤38 mph, ≤62 km/h) Tropical storm (39–73 mph, 63–118 km/h) Category 1 (74–95 mph, 119–153 km/h) Category 2 (96–110 mph, 154–177 km/h) Category 3 (111–129 mph, 178–208 km/h) Category 4 (130–156 mph, 209–251 km/h) Category 5 (≥157 mph, ≥252 km/h) Unknown Storm type Tropical cyclone Subtropical cyclone Extratropical cyclone, remnant low, tropical disturbance, or monsoon depression

In late September 1989, an active monsoon trough over the South China Sea spawned a tropical disturbance near northern Luzon. By September 28, a broad band of convection associated with a weak area of low pressure developed within the trough. Later that day, the Japan Meteorological Agency (JMA) began monitoring the system as a tropical depression. (Note: The Japan Meteorological Agency is the official Regional Specialized Meteorological Center for the western Pacific Ocean.) Aided by a well-defined anticyclone, the low quickly organized, prompting the Joint Typhoon Warning Center (JTWC) to issue a Tropical Cyclone Formation Alert. (Note: The Joint Typhoon Warning Center is a joint United States Navy – United States Air Force task force that issues tropical cyclone warnings for the western Pacific Ocean and other regions.) Initially steered westward by a subtropical ridge, the depression became quasi-stationary on September 30 about 360 km (225 mi) southeast of Hong Kong as the ridge weakened. Shortly after the system stalled, the JTWC also began warning on it as a tropical depression.

Following a reintensification of the ridge later on September 30, the depression resumed a west-southwesterly track. During this time, the depression attained tropical storm status and was given the name Brian by the JTWC. Over the following 24 hours, Brian continued to intensify and ultimately reached typhoon strength late on October 1. After developing a large eye, Brian reached its peak intensity on October 2 with winds of 150 km/h (90 mph; one-minute sustained). The JMA also classified Brian as a typhoon around this time, estimating the storm to have attained peak ten-minute sustained winds of 120 km/h (75 mph) as well as a minimum pressure of 970 mbar (hPa; 28.64 inHg). Now tracking due west, the typhoon moved towards Hainan Island and ultimately made landfall along the southeastern coast of the island around 1500 UTC.

Only slight weakening took place as the typhoon skirted along the southern coast of Hainan Island. By October 3, Brian had entered the Gulf of Tonkin and struck Vietnam later that day near Vinh with winds of 140 km/h (85 mph). Rapid dissipation ensued once onshore and Brian eventually dissipated on October 4 over the mountainous terrain of Laos.

== Impact ==
Striking Hainan Island as a strong typhoon, Brian caused widespread wind damage in the region. Approximately 700 km (430 mi) of power lines and 2,100 km (1,300 mi) of telephone lines were downed by the storm, severely disrupting communications. Many homes in southern areas of Hainan either collapsed or lost their roofs amidst hurricane-force winds. About 15,900 homes collapsed throughout the island and another 169,000 were damaged. Over 25 million lumber and rubber trees were snapped or uprooted by the typhoon. Heavy rains accompanying the storm triggered significant flash flooding. Many rivers across the island overtopped their banks and inundated surrounding areas, including an estimated 194,000 acres of rice paddies. Across Hainan, 40 people were killed and 529 others were injured by the storm. Losses throughout the region reached 837 million Renminbi (US$222 million).

Although Hong Kong was not in the direct path of the storm, the Hong Kong Observatory issued storm signals on September 30 as high winds associated with the typhoon were expected to impact the city. On October 2, the storm passed 270 km (170 mi) south of the city. Wind gusts associated with the storm reached 124 km/h (77 mph) on Waglan Island; however, no damage was reported. Along the coast, a storm surge of 0.62 m (2.0 ft) occurred on Waglan.

Due to the severe damage caused by Typhoon Brian, the provincial flood control headquarters urged the Chinese Government to organize relief efforts at all levels. By October 8, the Government of Hainan Island deployed two relief teams to the hardest hit areas. Additionally, 5 million Renminbi in aid was supplied to the region.

In Vietnam, heavy rains produced by the typhoon caused widespread flooding in northern provinces. Early assessments from the Vietnamese flood control committee indicated that 60,000 hectares (148,000 acres) of rice fields were submerged and 6,700 metric tons (7,400 short tons) of grain were soaked. High winds also caused extensive damage. At least 29,000 homes collapsed and 119,000 others were left roofless. Additionally, 572 hospitals or clinics were damaged. Several fatalities were reported in the region; however, they had yet to be verified by October 12. Within two weeks of Brian's passage, Typhoons Angela and Dan struck the country, causing further damage and loss of life. Due to the rapid succession of storms, losses resulting from the three typhoons are difficult to differentiate. Because of the widespread damage caused by the storms, the Vietnamese Government appealed for international assistance.

== See also ==
- 1989 Pacific typhoon season
- Typhoon Angela (1989)
- Typhoon Dan (1989)
- Typhoon Elsie (1989)
- Tropical Storm Son-Tinh (2018)
