= Typhoon Brenda (1989) =

Pacific typhoon in 1989

Typhoon Brenda (Bining)
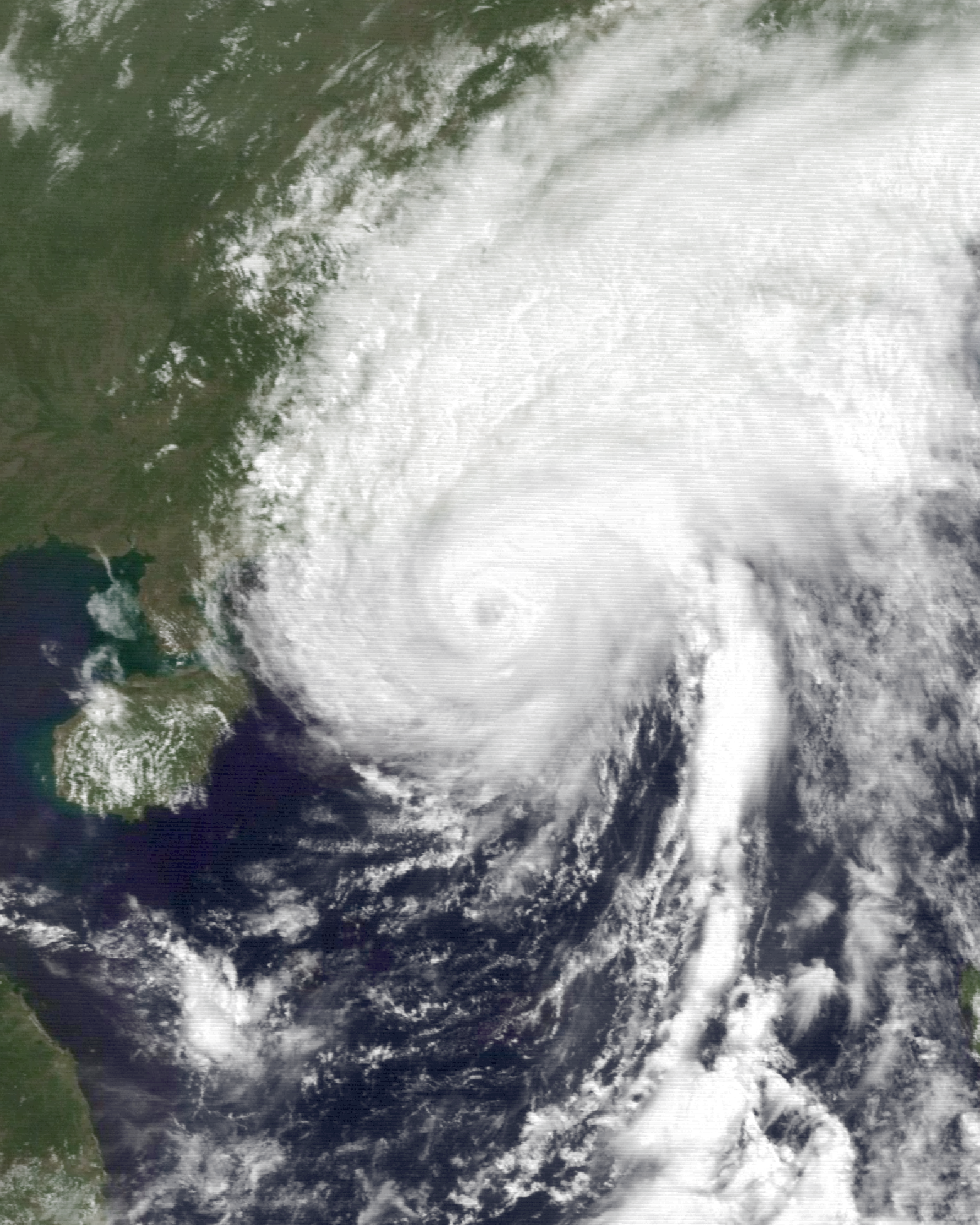
- Typhoon Brenda at peak intensity, approaching southern China on May 20

Meteorological history
- Formed: May 14, 1989
- Dissipated: May 21, 1989

Typhoon
- 10-minute sustained (JMA)
- Highest winds: 120 km/h (75 mph)
- Lowest pressure: 970 hPa (mbar); 28.64 inHg

Category 1-equivalent typhoon
- 1-minute sustained (SSHWS/JTWC)
- Highest winds: 140 km/h (85 mph)
- Lowest pressure: 967 hPa (mbar); 28.56 inHg

Overall effects
- Fatalities: 104 total
- Missing: 40–53
- Damage: $2.86 million (1989 USD); Philippine total only
- IBTrACS
- Part of the 1989 Pacific typhoon season

Typhoon Brenda, known in the Philippines as Tropical Storm Bining, caused significant loss of life in the Philippines and China in May 1989.

== Meteorological history ==
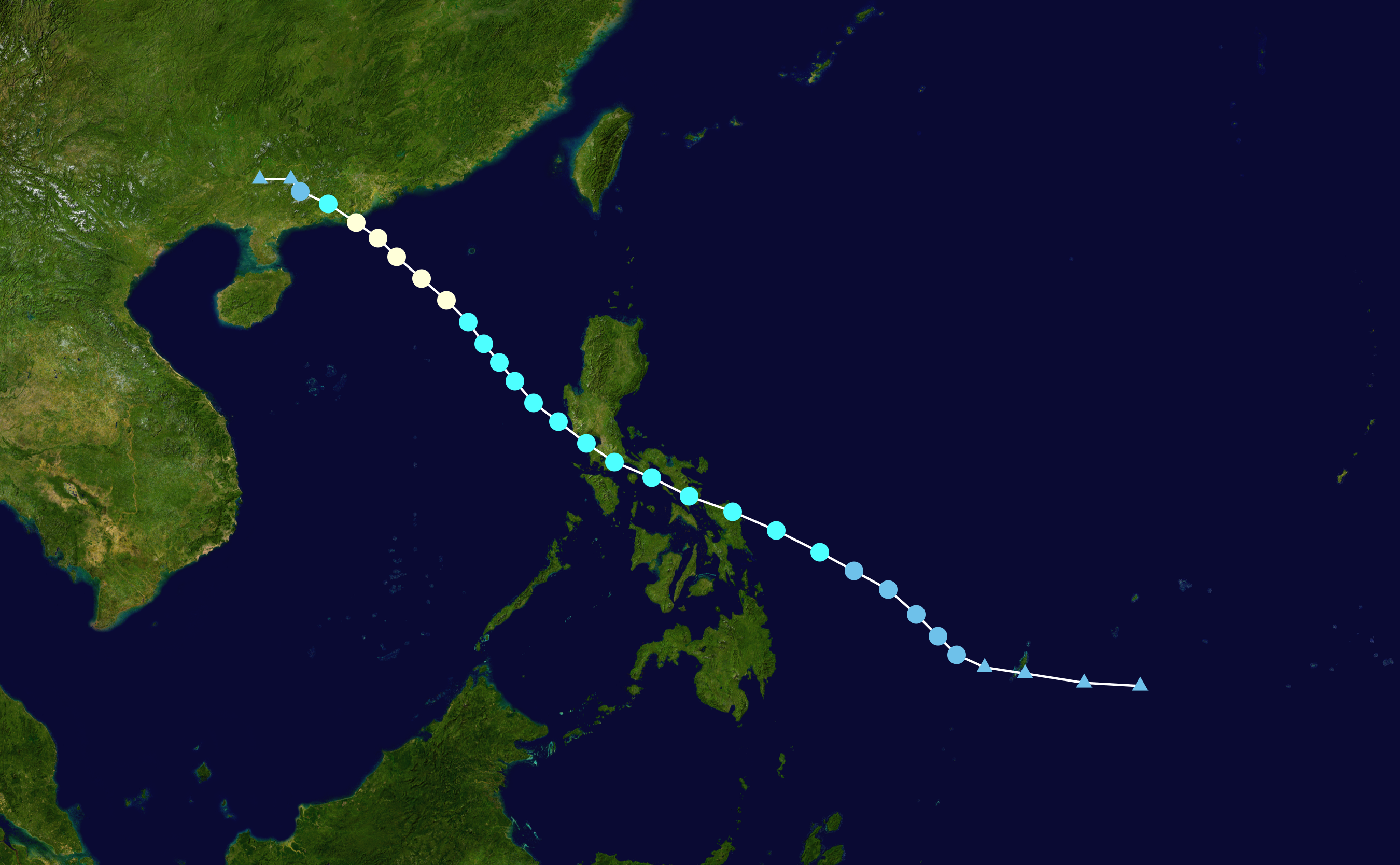
Map plotting the storm's track and intensity, according to the Saffir–Simpson scale Map key Saffir–Simpson scale Tropical depression (≤38 mph, ≤62 km/h) Tropical storm (39–73 mph, 63–118 km/h) Category 1 (74–95 mph, 119–153 km/h) Category 2 (96–110 mph, 154–177 km/h) Category 3 (111–129 mph, 178–208 km/h) Category 4 (130–156 mph, 209–251 km/h) Category 5 (≥157 mph, ≥252 km/h) Unknown Storm type Tropical cyclone Subtropical cyclone Extratropical cyclone, remnant low, tropical disturbance, or monsoon depression

A tropical depression which formed in the monsoon trough on May 14 became a tropical storm on May 16 and was named Brenda. Brenda struck Samar Island, then southern Luzon in the Philippines that day. Due to the cyclone's proximity to the Philippines, the Philippine Atmospheric, Geophysical and Astronomical Services Administration also monitored the storm and assigned it with the local name Bining.

After Brenda struck the Philippines, Brenda became a typhoon and reached a peak of 85 mph (137 km/h) winds. After peaking, Brenda made landfall in southern China on May 20. Brenda weakened to a tropical depression and dissipated on the mext day.

== Preparations and impact ==
=== Philippines ===
On May 16, storm warnings were issued for 20 provinces across the Philippines as Brenda approached the country. Multiple commercial vessels were kept at port until the storm passed. At least 50 domestic Philippine Airlines flights were canceled and international flights were diverted to airports not in the path of the typhoon.

Strong winds produced by Brenda caused widespread disruption from the Visayas through Luzon, downing numerous trees and power lines. Significant power disruption occurred in the Bicol Region as well as the Central Visayas. Three people were killed in Manila after a car was thrown into a bus by strong winds. On May 16, during the filming of Delta Force 2: The Colombian Connection, a helicopter crashed roughly 45 km (30 mi) south of Manila, killing five people and injuring four others. The crash was associated with strong winds from Brenda that made flying difficult.

Flooding triggered by the storm prompted officials to evacuate over 5,700 people.

Rough seas associated with the typhoon were responsible for several incidents across the Philippines. Two people drowned and thirteen others were reported missing after a motor launch capsized roughly 320 km (200 mi) east of Manila. Off the coast of Calavite Island, 23 people went missing after the cargo vessel MV Zambales sank. In Albay Province, the Corazon-II sank while berthed at the Tobaco town pier. Additionally, the five-ton vessel Albert sank off the southern tip of Luzon with five crewmen. The crew reportedly drifted at sea for three days before tying a makeshift raft to a sea turtle which towed them to safety.

Throughout the Philippines 13–19 people were killed by the storm while another 40–53 were reported missing. A total of 652 homes were destroyed while another 4,392 were damaged. Losses from the storm amounted to 73 million pesos (US$2.86 million).

=== Hong Kong ===
On May 20, 322.8 mm (12.71 in) of rain fell in Hong Kong, marking the second-wettest day in May on record as well as the eighth-wettest day overall.

That same day in Beijing, which was in the midst of the 1989 student movement, martial law was declared. Protests in support of the Beijing movement were planned and proceeded in Hong Kong in spite of the typhoon.

In the Lam Tsuen Valley, unusually heavy rains produced by the storm triggered 31 landslides.

=== China ===
Typhoon Brenda made landfall in southern China on May 20–21, 1989, with maximum sustained winds of approximately 85 mph, following a path through the Philippines. The system brought significant heavy rainfall and high winds to the region, particularly impacting Guangdong province, where reports indicated 84 deaths and the destruction of over 7,300 homes. Coastal regions in China implemented storm warnings during the approach, and in nearby Hong Kong, the storm was associated with torrential rain and localized landslides.

== See also ==
- Tropical Storm Cecil (1989)
- Typhoon Rammasun (2014)
- Tropical Storm Rumbia (2013)
