= List of storms named Blanche =

The name Blanche has been used for five tropical cyclones worldwide: two in the Atlantic Ocean, two in the Australian region, and one in the South-West Indian Ocean.

In the Atlantic:

- Hurricane Blanche (1969) – did not significantly affect land.
- Hurricane Blanche (1975) – affected Maine and Nova Scotia.

In the Australian region:

- Cyclone Blanche (1987) – also known as Blanch, affected the Solomon Islands and Vanuatu.
- Cyclone Blanche (2017) – made landfall on Australia.

In the South-West Indian:

- Cyclone Blanche (1969) – dissipated near Tanzania.
