= Typhoon Bess (1965) =

Category 5 Pacific typhoon in 1965

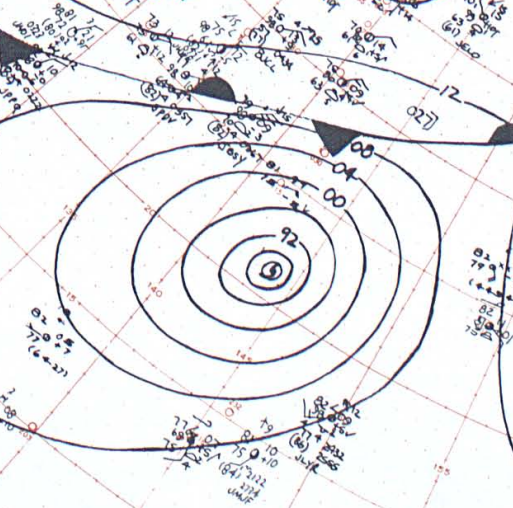
- Surface weather analysis of Bess at peak intensity on 30 September

Meteorological history
- Formed: 25 September 1965
- Extratropical: 6 October 1965
- Dissipated: 8 October 1965
- Duration: 1 week, 6 days

Violent typhoon
- 10-minute sustained (JMA)
- Highest winds: 195 km/h (120 mph)
- Lowest pressure: 900 hPa (mbar); 26.58 inHg

Category 5-equivalent super typhoon
- 1-minute sustained (SSHWS/JTWC)
- Highest winds: 280 km/h (175 mph)
- Lowest pressure: 901 hPa (mbar); 26.61 inHg

Overall effects
- Fatalities: Unknown
- Missing: Unknown
- Damage: Unknown
- Areas affected: Northern Mariana Islands, Russia Far East, Alaska
- Part of the 1965 Pacific typhoon season

Typhoon Bess was a large and powerful tropical cyclone that affected parts of the Northern Mariana Islands, Far eastern Russia and Alaska in September and October 1965. Bess was the strongest of eleven systems labelled as a super typhoon by the Joint Typhoon Warning Center (JTWC) in the 1965 Pacific typhoon season, and was also the strongest known tropical cyclone globally in 1965.

Typhoon Bess has an unknown impact on the Mariana Islands, as records of damage at the time were not kept well and were likely mixed up with Typhoon Carmen, which was said to have a major impact on the island just a few days after Bess.

== Meteorological history ==
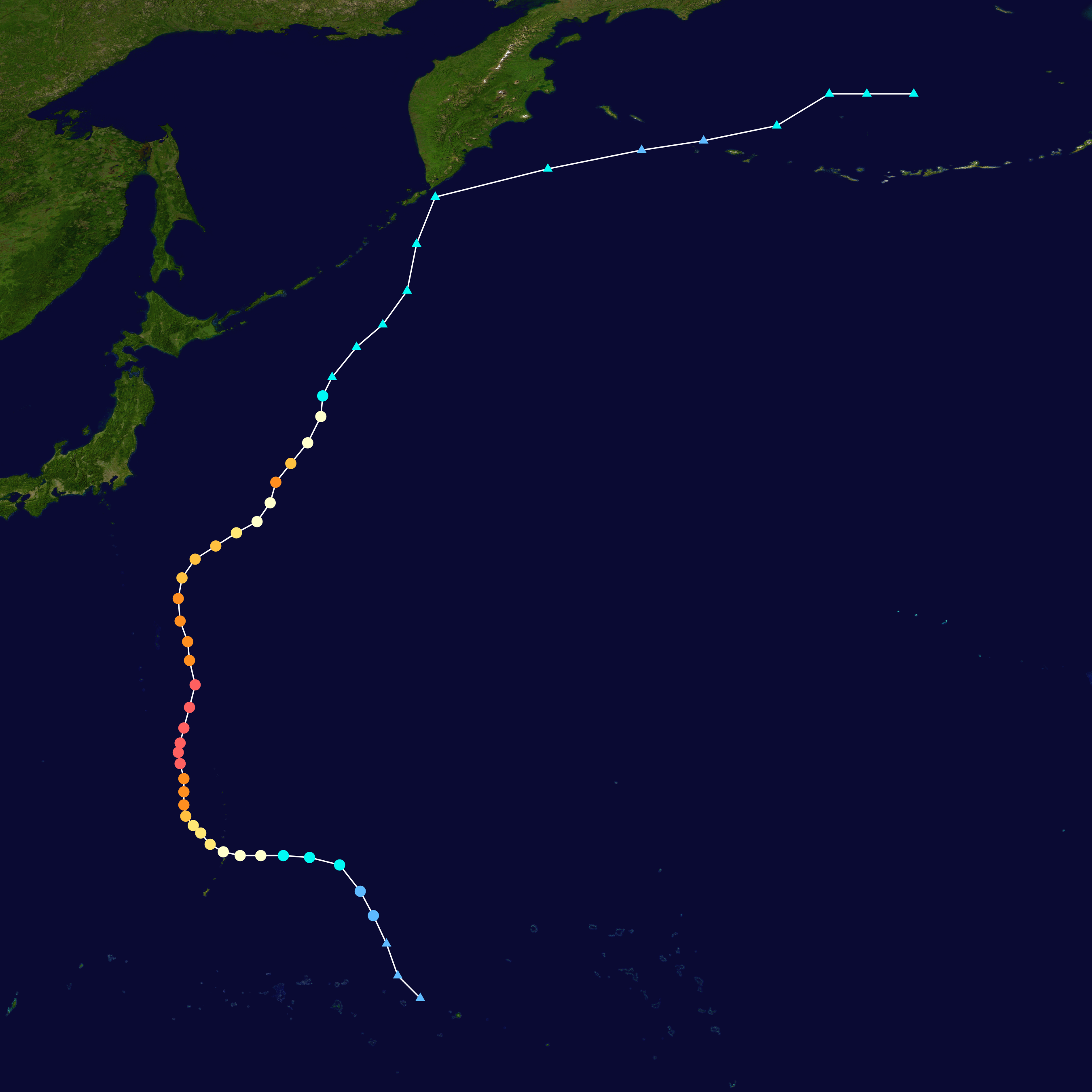
Map plotting the storm's track and intensity, according to the Saffir–Simpson scale Map key Saffir–Simpson scale Tropical depression (≤38 mph, ≤62 km/h) Tropical storm (39–73 mph, 63–118 km/h) Category 1 (74–95 mph, 119–153 km/h) Category 2 (96–110 mph, 154–177 km/h) Category 3 (111–129 mph, 178–208 km/h) Category 4 (130–156 mph, 209–251 km/h) Category 5 (≥157 mph, ≥252 km/h) Unknown Storm type Tropical cyclone Subtropical cyclone Extratropical cyclone, remnant low, tropical disturbance, or monsoon depression

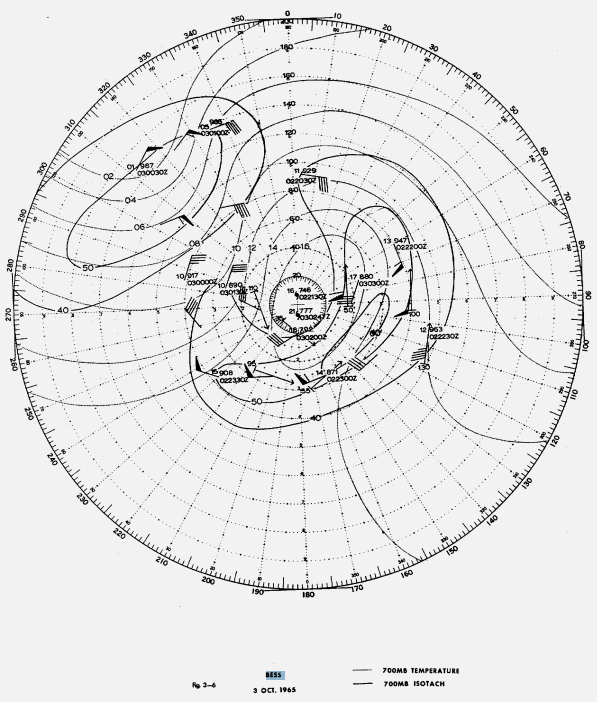
700 hPa temperature and isotach map of Typhoon Bess on 3 October 1965

Bess formed on the 25 September northeast of Pohnpei, Micronesia where it would track east for 18 hours. The next day, the storm would officially be recognized as a tropical depression on the Saffir-Simpson scale whilst moving northwest. Twelve hours later at 6pm, the depression would be upgraded to a tropical storm with barometric pressure of 998 hPa and would be assigned the name Bess by the JTWC. (Note: Besides the typhoon's peak peak intensity, this is the only time that pressure would be recorded in the storm's lifespan.)

Once becoming a tropical storm, Bess would start drifting to the east. The storm would reach hurricane-force winds on the 27 September with winds of 120 km/h (75 mph) and would be recognized as a typhoon by the Japan Meteorological Agency (JMA). Bess reached Category 2 winds the next morning at 6am whilst gradually turning to the north. Bess would intensify and hit Category 4 winds exactly a day later on the 29th. Typhoon Bess would hit its peak intensity on the 30th September with 1-minute sustained winds of 280 km/h and barometric pressure of 900 hPa, sustaining its winds for 36 hours. In this state, Bess would have circulation of over 960 km (600 mi).

On the 1st October, the storm would weaken back into a Category 4 super typhoon and would begin weakening. Bess would become a Category 3 typhoon the next day on the 2nd; starting to move northeast. Another 18 hours later on the next day, the storm would begin rapidly weakening; becoming a Category 1 typhoon just 12 hours later. Unexpectedly on the 4th October, Bess would experience an extreme case of rapid intensification, jumping from winds of 150 to 205 km/h in just 6 hours. This intensity would be short lived as Bess weakened back to a Category 1 typhoon just 12 hours later.

Exactly 18 hours after Bess reached Category 4 intensity, the storm had dropped to winds of 110 km/h; a tropical storm on the Saffir-Simpson scale. Whilst moving to the northeast where it would slightly accelerate, the storm continued to weaken, briefly becoming a tropical depression on the 6th October and becoming an extratropical cyclone that same day. The now extratropical cyclone drifted east, passing Russia and then dissipated on the 8th October nearby Alaska.

== See also ==
- 1965 Pacific typhoon season
- List of super typhoons
- Rapid intensification
