= List of storms named Betty =

The name Betty has been used for a total of 21 tropical cyclones worldwide. Seventeen were in the West Pacific Ocean, including three in the Philippine Area of Responsibility, and one each occurred in the Atlantic Ocean, South Pacific Ocean, Australian region, and South-West Indian Ocean. In addition, Betty has been used for one European windstorm.

In the Atlantic:

- Hurricane Betty (1972) – a Category 2 hurricane (initially a subtropical system named Bravo) which developed north-northeast of Bermuda but did not make landfall.

In the West Pacific:

- Tropical Storm Betty (1945) – a short-lived early season storm that did not affect land.
- Typhoon Betty (1946) – a strong typhoon that brushed the coasts of the Philippines and Japan.
- Typhoon Betty (1949) (T4923) – a late-season tropical cyclone that hit southern Philippines.
- Typhoon Betty (1953) (T5319) – a powerful typhoon which took an unusual south-southeastward path from Hainan to the Philippines.
- Typhoon Betty (1958) (T5812) – a short-lived but relatively strong system that was considered by the Japan Meteorological Agency (JMA) as a typhoon, despite the Joint Typhoon Warning Center only considering it as a high-end tropical storm.
- Typhoon Betty (1961) (T6104, 11W) – an early-season Category 4-equivalent super typhoon which struck Taiwan and eastern China.
- Typhoon Betty (1964) (T6405, 07W, Edeng) – a typhoon that formed to the east of Taiwan and passed near Shanghai.
- Severe Tropical Storm Betty (1966) (T6617, 17W) – a strong tropical storm that brushed southern Japan and eventually made landfall in South Korea.
- Typhoon Betty (1969) (T6908, 08W, Huling) – a minimal typhoon that struck Taiwan and China.
- Typhoon Betty (1972) (T7214, 14W, Maring) – a Category 4-equivalent super typhoon that passed through the Ryukyu Islands and Taiwan before striking China.
- Typhoon Betty (1975) (T7512, 14W, Ising) – a relatively strong typhoon which struck Taiwan and China.
- Typhoon Betty (1980) (T8021, 25W, Aring) – a powerful typhoon which caused $181 million worth of damages to the Philippines and killed 101 people.
- Severe Tropical Storm Betty (1984) (T8404, 04W, Konsing) – a tropical storm which affected the Philippines and China.
- Typhoon Betty (1987) (T8709, 09W, Herming) – a Category 5-equivalent super typhoon that severely impacted the Philippines, Vietnam and Thailand, causing $100 million worth of damages and claiming a total of 92 lives.
- Tropical Storm Bavi (2015) (T1503, 03W, Betty) – affected Kiribati, Marshall Islands, Mariana Islands, and the Philippines.
- Typhoon Wutip (2019) (T1902, 02W, Betty) – a Category 5-equivalent super typhoon, caused over $3.3 million (2019 USD) in damages in Guam and Micronesia.
- Typhoon Mawar (2023) (T2302, 02W, Betty) – another Category 5-equivalent super typhoon which severely affected Guam and later crossed Okinawa.

In the Australian region:

- Tropical Cyclone Betty (1966) – a cyclone which made landfall in Australia's Northern Territory.

In the South Pacific:

- Cyclone Betty (1975) – an erratic and relatively strong tropical cyclone that looped near Fiji.

In the South-West Indian:

- Tropical Storm Betty (1963) – a weak system which affected no land areas.

In Europe:

- Storm Betty (2023) – struck Ireland and the United Kingdom during mid-August 2023.

| Preceded by Amang | Pacific typhoon season names Betty | Succeeded by Chedeng |
