= List of storms named Billie =

The name Billie has been used for nine tropical cyclones in the West Pacific Ocean:

- Typhoon Billie (1950) (T5039) – a Category 1-equivalent typhoon.
- Typhoon Billie (1955) (T5505) – a Category 3-equivalent typhoon that made landfall in China.
- Typhoon Billie (1959) (T5905, 08W) – a Category 2-equivalent typhoon that became the first tropical cyclone to be tracked by the Joint Typhoon Warning Center.
- Typhoon Billie (1961) (T6126, 62W) – a Category 1-equivalent typhoon.
- Tropical Storm Billie (1964) (T6422, 34W, Kayang) – tracked across the Philippines and Vietnam.
- Typhoon Billie (1967) (T6707, 07W, Herming) – a Category 1-equivalent typhoon that caused over 300 fatalities in Japan.
- Typhoon Billie (1970) (T7011, 12W, Loleng) – a Category 3-equivalent typhoon that affected the Ryukyu Islands and the Korean Peninsula.
- Typhoon Billie (1973) (T7303, 04W, Bining) – a Category 4-equivalent super typhoon that affected the Philippines, Ryukyu Islands, and China.
- Typhoon Billie (1976) (T7613, 13W, Nitang) – a Category 4-equivalent typhoon that made landfall in Taiwan and China and caused 48 fatalities.

== See also ==
- List of storms named Billy – a similar name that has been used in the Australian region.
