= Typhoon Billie (1976) =

Pacific typhoon in 1976

Typhoon Billie (Nitang)
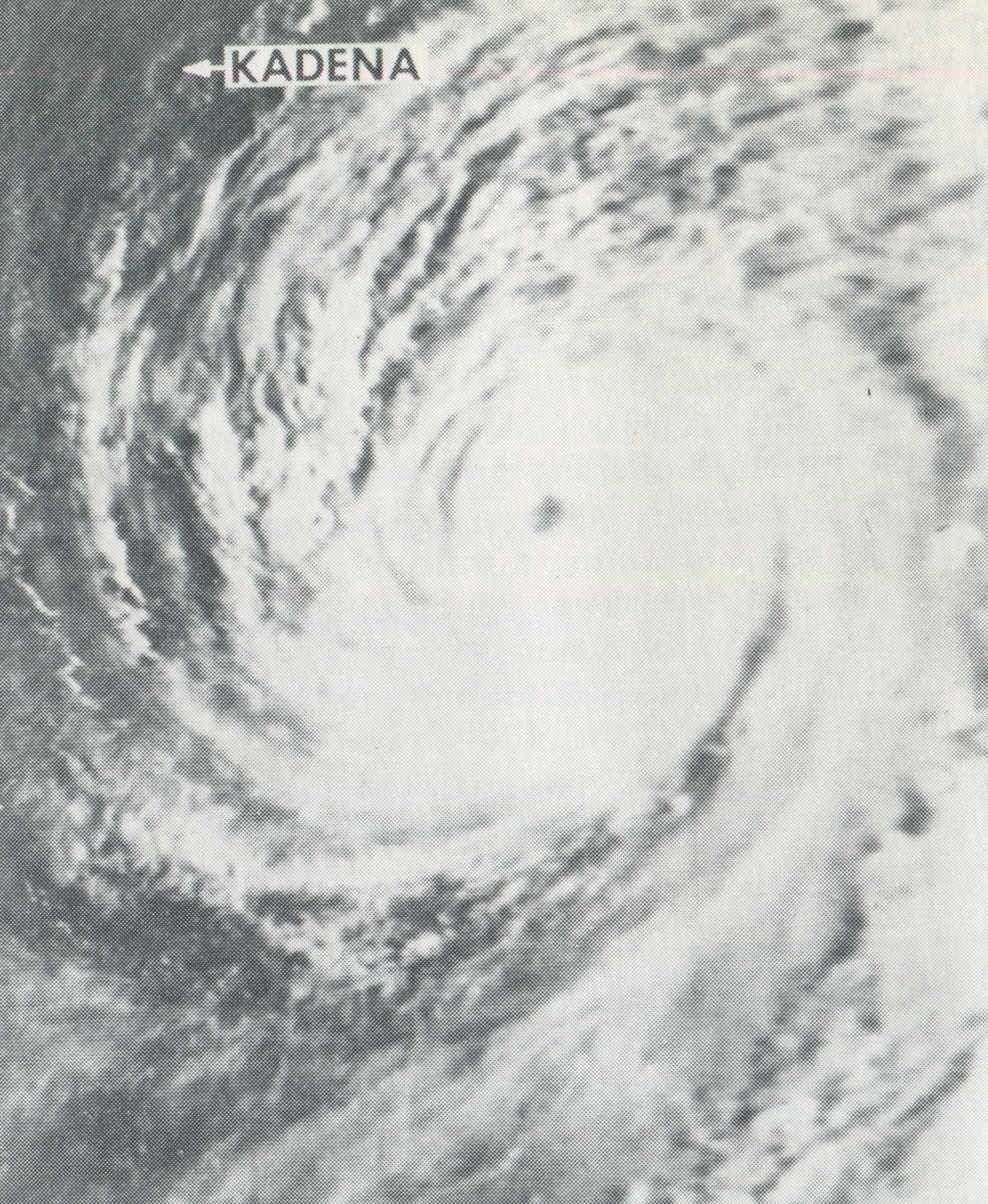
- Typhoon Billie on August 7, 1976

Meteorological history
- Formed: August 3, 1976
- Remnant low: August 12, 1976
- Dissipated: August 14, 1976

Typhoon
- 10-minute sustained (JMA)
- Lowest pressure: 915 hPa (mbar); 27.02 inHg

Category 4-equivalent typhoon
- 1-minute sustained (SSHWS/JTWC)
- Highest winds: 230 km/h (145 mph)
- Lowest pressure: 914 hPa (mbar); 26.99 inHg

Overall effects
- Fatalities: 48 direct
- Damage: $2.6 million (1976 USD)
- Areas affected: Japan, Taiwan, Eastern China
- IBTrACS
- Part of the 1976 Pacific typhoon season

Typhoon Billie, known in the Philippines as Typhoon Nitang, was an early August Category 4–equivalent typhoon that affected southern Japan, Taiwan and China. Billie left 48 people dead and eight others missing (mostly at sea) and left $2.6 million (1976 USD, $8.9 million 2005 USD) in damage in Taiwan and eastern China after its 3449 km track across the far western Pacific.

== Meteorological history ==
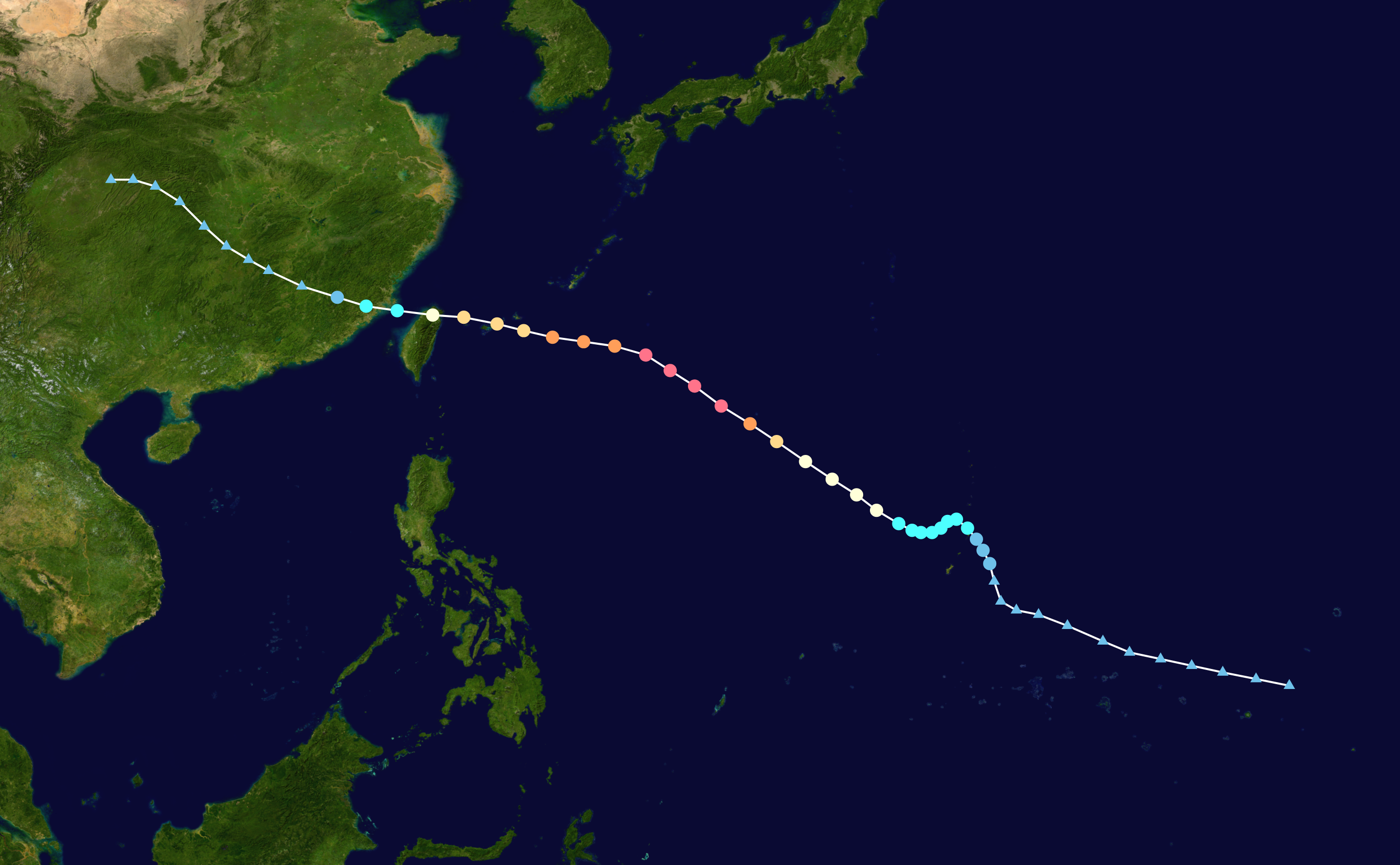
Map plotting the storm's track and intensity, according to the Saffir–Simpson scale Map key Saffir–Simpson scale Tropical depression (≤38 mph, ≤62 km/h) Tropical storm (39–73 mph, 63–118 km/h) Category 1 (74–95 mph, 119–153 km/h) Category 2 (96–110 mph, 154–177 km/h) Category 3 (111–129 mph, 178–208 km/h) Category 4 (130–156 mph, 209–251 km/h) Category 5 (≥157 mph, ≥252 km/h) Unknown Storm type Tropical cyclone Subtropical cyclone Extratropical cyclone, remnant low, tropical disturbance, or monsoon depression

A tropical disturbance 180 miles (290 km) northeast of Ponape formed on July 31 and moved westward as it continued to strengthen, becoming Tropical Depression 13W on August 3. Interacting with a subtropical ridge to the north, the tropical depression turned sharply northeast and passed over Saipan before strengthening into Tropical Storm Billie.

Driven by a high pressure system and a trough, Billie then turned to the southwest and then westward and intensified into a typhoon on August 5. On August 7, Typhoon Billie underwent rapid intensification, reaching a maximum intensity of 140 mph (125 knots).

By August 12, the tropical cyclone had encountered wind shear which weakened the storm, before it made landfall on Taiwan as a Category 1 typhoon, and later on China China as a tropical storm. Billie degenerated into a remnant low soon after landfall. However, the system's remnants persisted for another couple of days, as they moved deeper into China, before dissipating on August 14.

== Impact ==
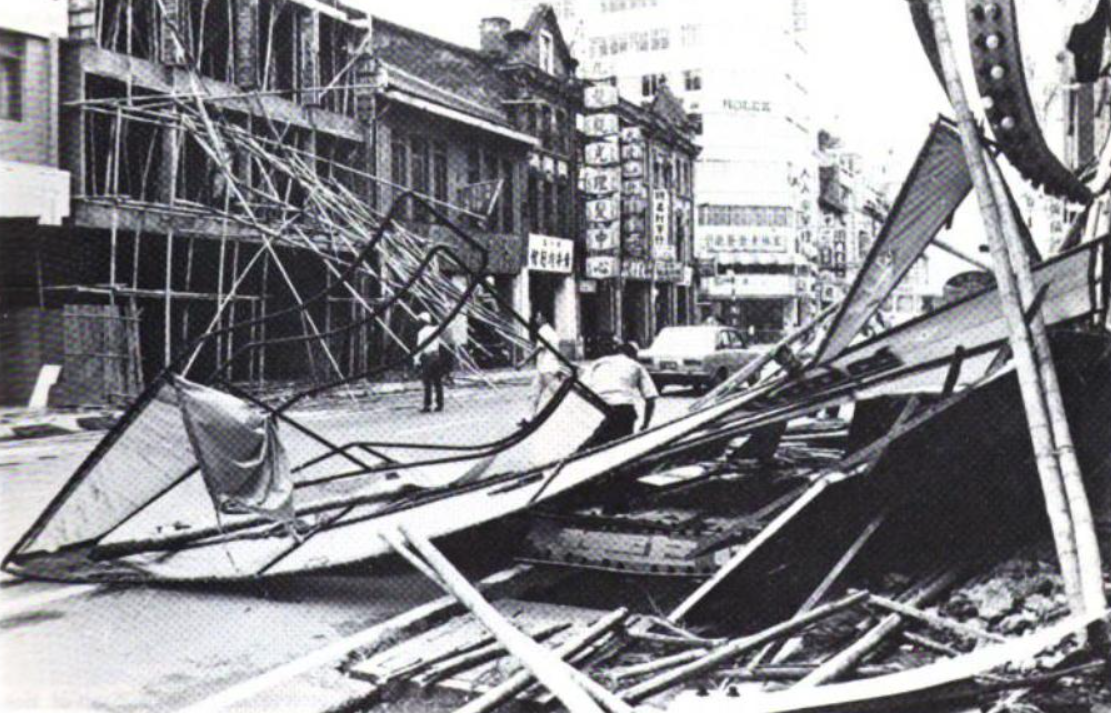
Damage in Taiwan after Typhoon Billie

Billie skirted the Ryūkyū Islands before making landfall in Taiwan and again in eastern China, producing huge waves that drowned 41 fishermen and swimmers along the coast of Japan. A JTWC weather station in Miyakojima reported a barometric pressure of 962 millibars and winds of 51 mph (82 km/h). In Ishigakijima, a weather station reported winds of 109 mph (175 km/h) and a barometric pressure of 952 millibars.

Billie's second landfall was south of Taipei, Taiwan where a weather station reported 81 mph (130 km/h) winds. However, at the Taipei International Airport, the winds were at 40 mph (64 km/h) with gusts up to 75 mph (121 km/h). Billie's impact in Taiwan was destructive as the storm sank three ships and damaged several others and killed seven people, leaving eight others missing, injured 24 and left $2.6 million (1976 USD, $8.9 million 2005 USD) in damage.

The third and final landfall was in eastern China as a tropical storm which brought 70 mph (110 km/h) winds and heavy rain but there were no reports of deaths or damage reported.

== See also ==
- Other storms of the same name
