= List of storms named Billy =

The name Billy has been used for four tropical cyclones in the Australian region:

- Cyclone Billy (1986) – a Category 4 severe tropical cyclone that existed in the South-West Indian Ocean as Cyclone Lila.
- Cyclone Billy (1998) – a Category 3 severe tropical cyclone that made landfall in Western Australia.
- Cyclone Billy (2008) – a Category 4 severe tropical cyclone that made landfall in Australia.
- Cyclone Billy (2022) – a Category 2 tropical cyclone that did not affect land.

== See also ==
Similar names that have been used for tropical cyclones:

- Cyclone Bijli (2009) – used in the North Indian Ocean.
- List of storms named Bill – used in the Atlantic Ocean and the West Pacific Ocean.
- List of storms named Billie – used in the West Pacific Ocean.
- List of storms named Willy – also used in the Australian region.
