= 1955 Pacific typhoon season =

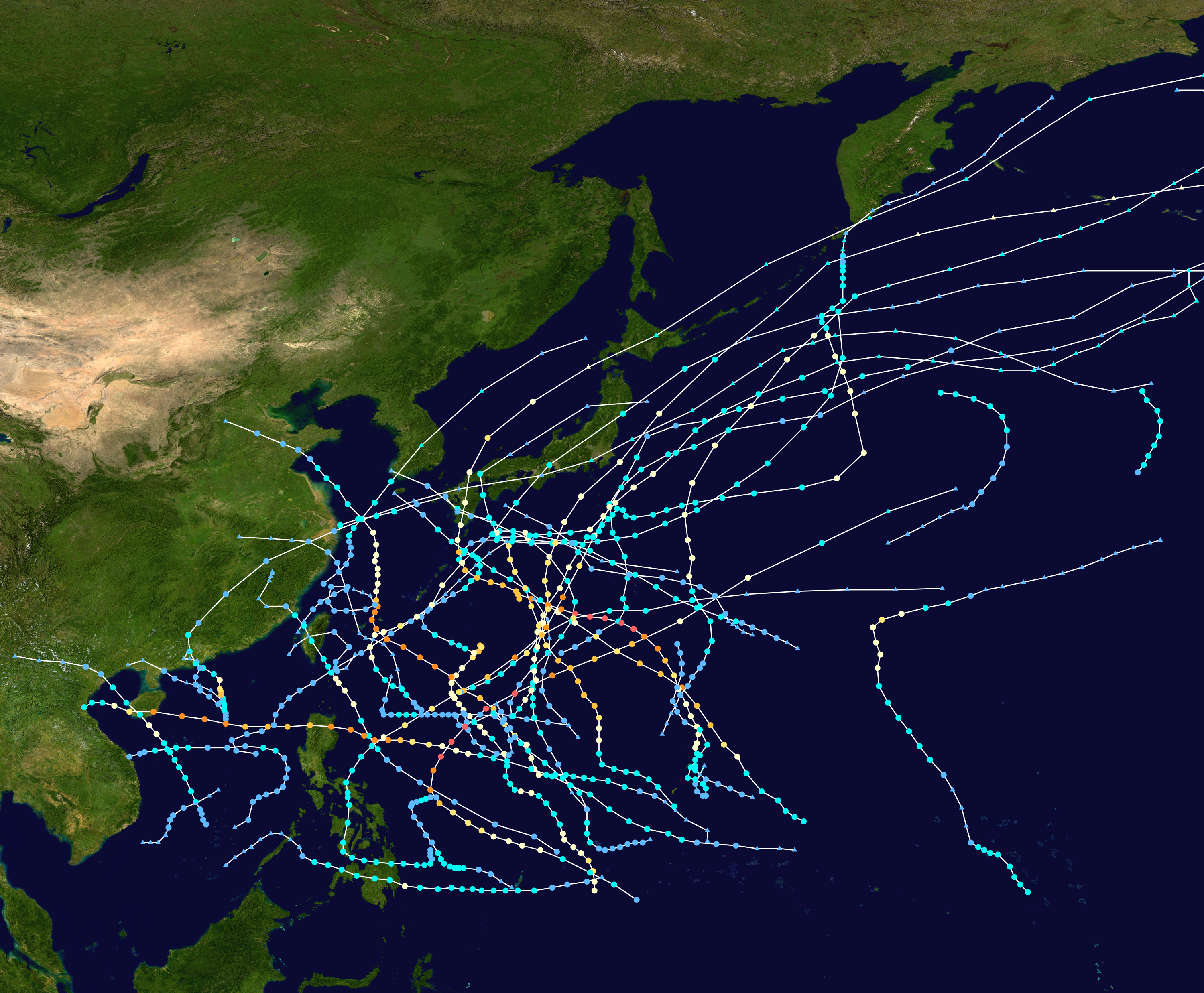
- Season summary map

Seasonal boundaries
- First system formed: January 1, 1955
- Last system dissipated: December 18, 1955

Strongest storm
- Name: Ruth
  - Maximum winds: 335 km/h (205 mph) (1-minute sustained)
  - Lowest pressure: 888 hPa (mbar)

Seasonal statistics
- Total depressions: 39
- Total storms: 31
- Typhoons: 20
- Very strong typhoons: 4 (unofficial)
- Total fatalities: Unknown
- Total damage: Unknown

Related articles
- 1955 Atlantic hurricane season; 1955 Pacific hurricane season; 1950s North Indian Ocean cyclone seasons

The 1955 Pacific typhoon season has no official bounds; it ran year-round in 1955, but most tropical cyclones tend to form in the northwestern Pacific Ocean between June and December. These dates conventionally delimit the period of each year when most tropical cyclones form in the northwestern Pacific Ocean. The season produced a large number of tropical storms but most of them were weak, and sources from American typhoon warning agencies often grossly overestimated the maximum wind speed of many systems which could not properly match with their respective central pressure observations.

The scope of this article is limited to the Pacific Ocean, north of the equator and west of the International Date Line. Storms that form east of the date line and north of the equator are called hurricanes; see 1955 Pacific hurricane season. Tropical Storms formed in the entire west Pacific basin were assigned a name by the Fleet Weather Center on Guam.

== Systems ==
The rest of the storms, such as unnumbered and unnamed tropical depressions and storms, are only classified by the CMA while the JMA is sometimes rare before the 1960s - 1970s.

=== Typhoon Violet ===
- Typhoon (JMA)
- Category 1 typhoon (SSHWS)
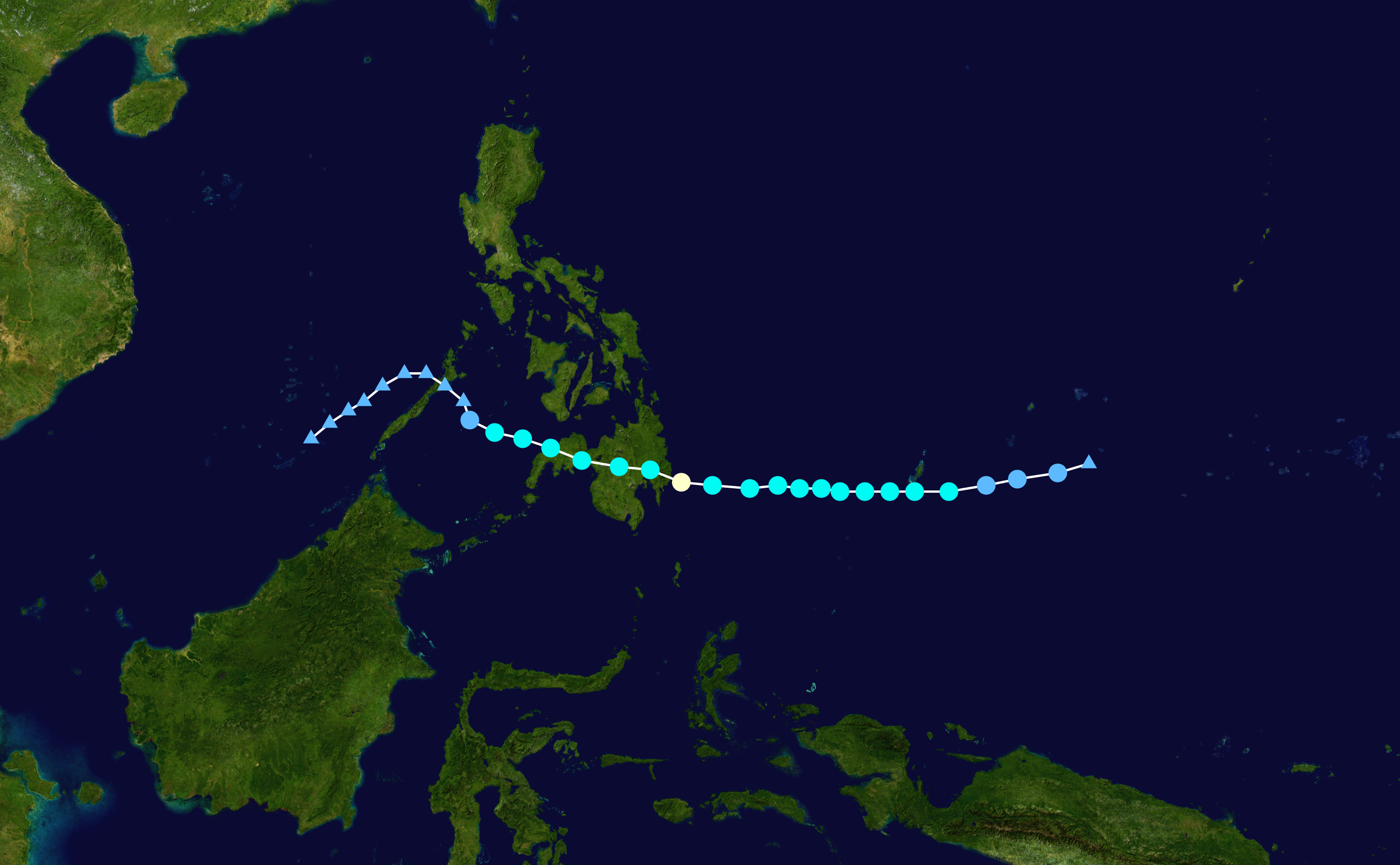
- Duration: January 1 – January 6
- Peak intensity: 140 km/h (85 mph) (1-min); 995 hPa (mbar)

Typhoon Violet formed on January 1 and dissipated on January 6. It peaked as a Category 1 typhoon by the JTWC before making landfall in Mindinao in the Philippines.

=== JMA Tropical Storm Two ===
- Tropical storm (JMA)
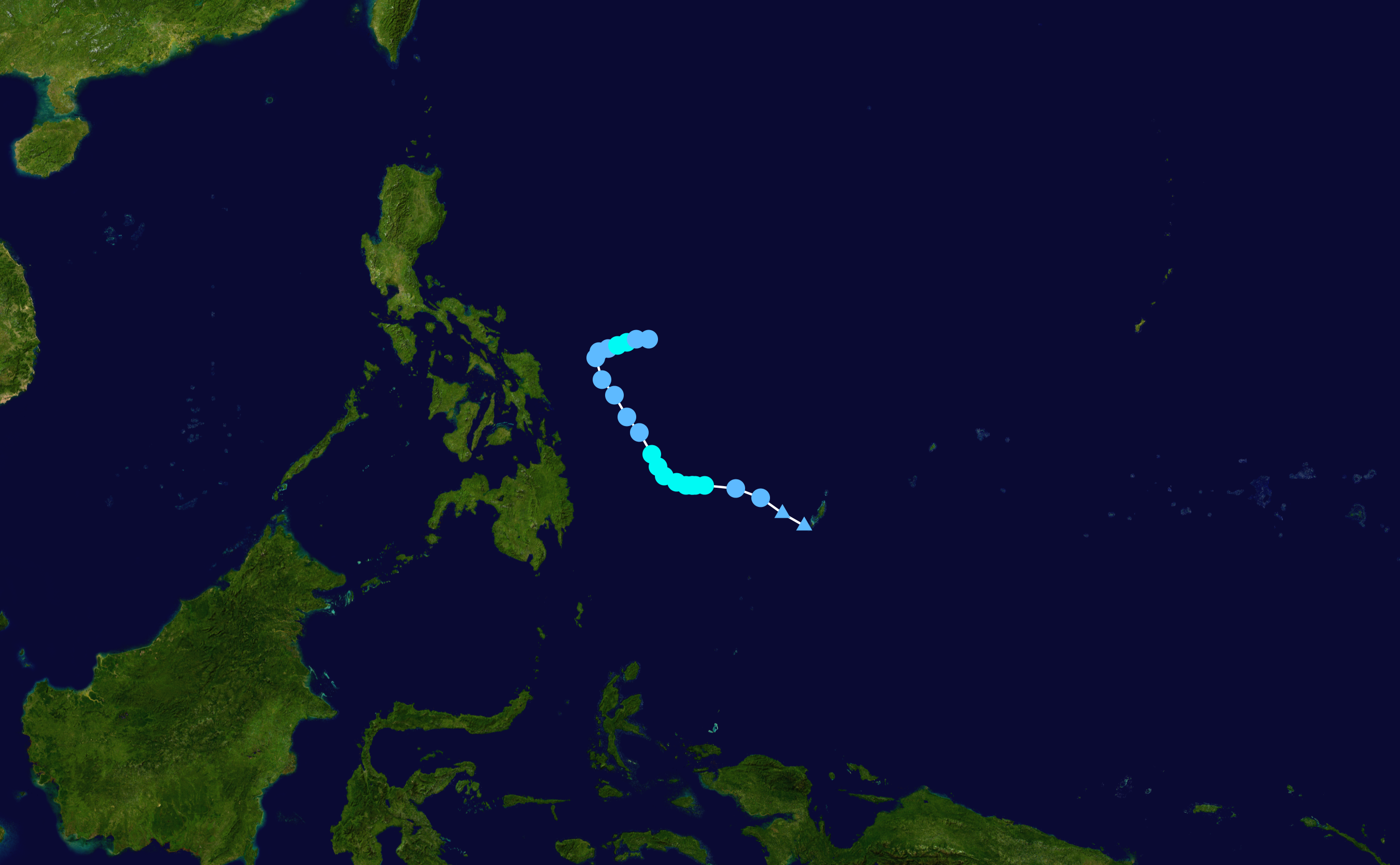
- Duration: February 23 – February 28
- Peak intensity: 85 km/h (50 mph) (10-min); 995 hPa (mbar)

The storm formed on February 23. It slowly moved northwest and intensified into a tropical storm. It soon dissipated on February 28.

=== Typhoon Wilda ===
- Typhoon (JMA)
- Category 2 typhoon (SSHWS)
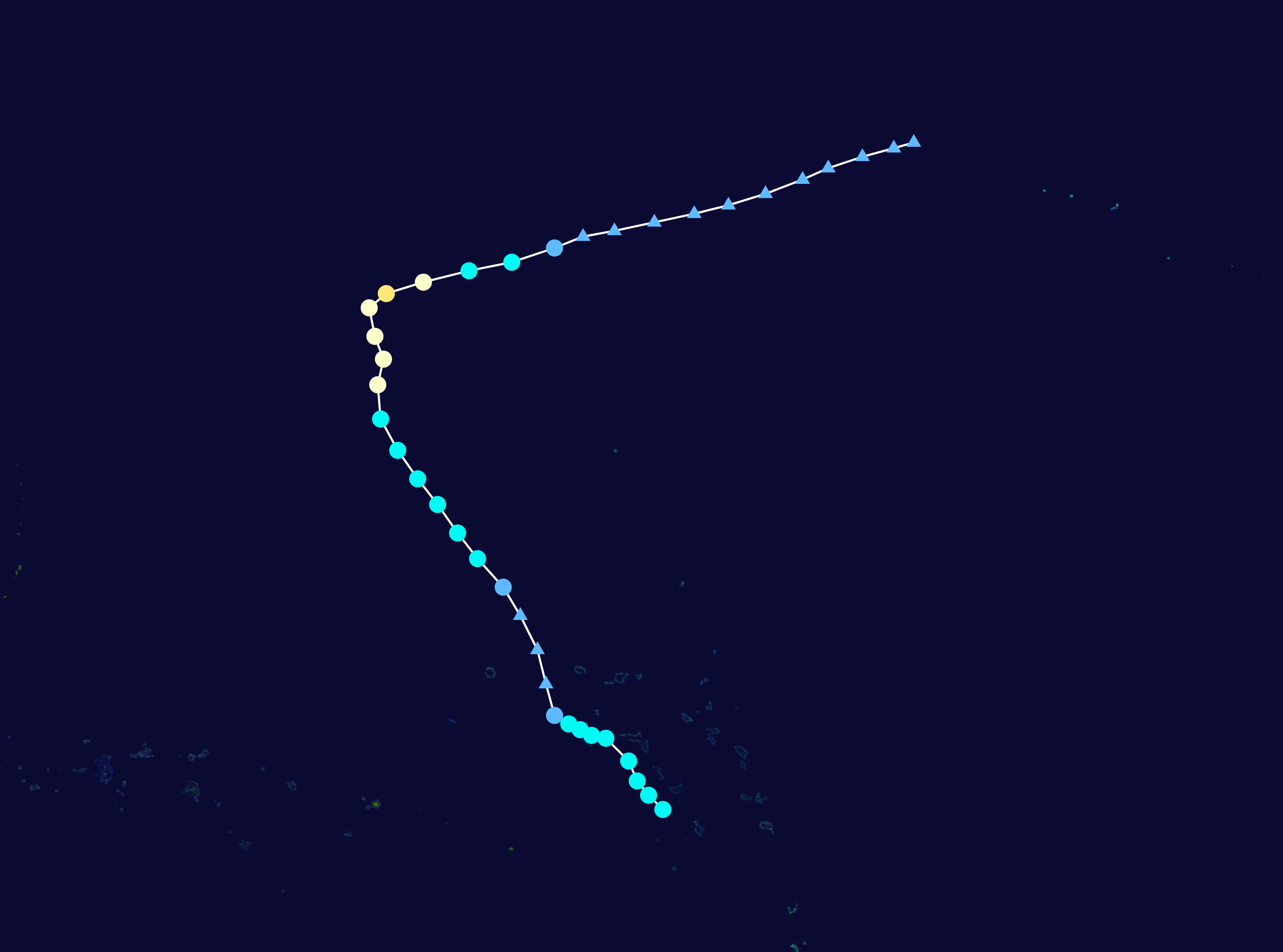
- Duration: March 21 – March 29
- Peak intensity: 165 km/h (105 mph) (1-min); 985 hPa (mbar)

Forming in an area full of islands, Wilda moved up into the open ocean where it reached typhoon strength. Shortly after, Wilda peaked in intensity as a lower-end category 2 cyclone. Wilda soon made a turn and began to weaken. Soon enough, Wilda had weakened under typhoon strength and dissipated on March 29.

=== Typhoon Anita ===
- Typhoon (JMA)
- Category 3 typhoon (SSHWS)
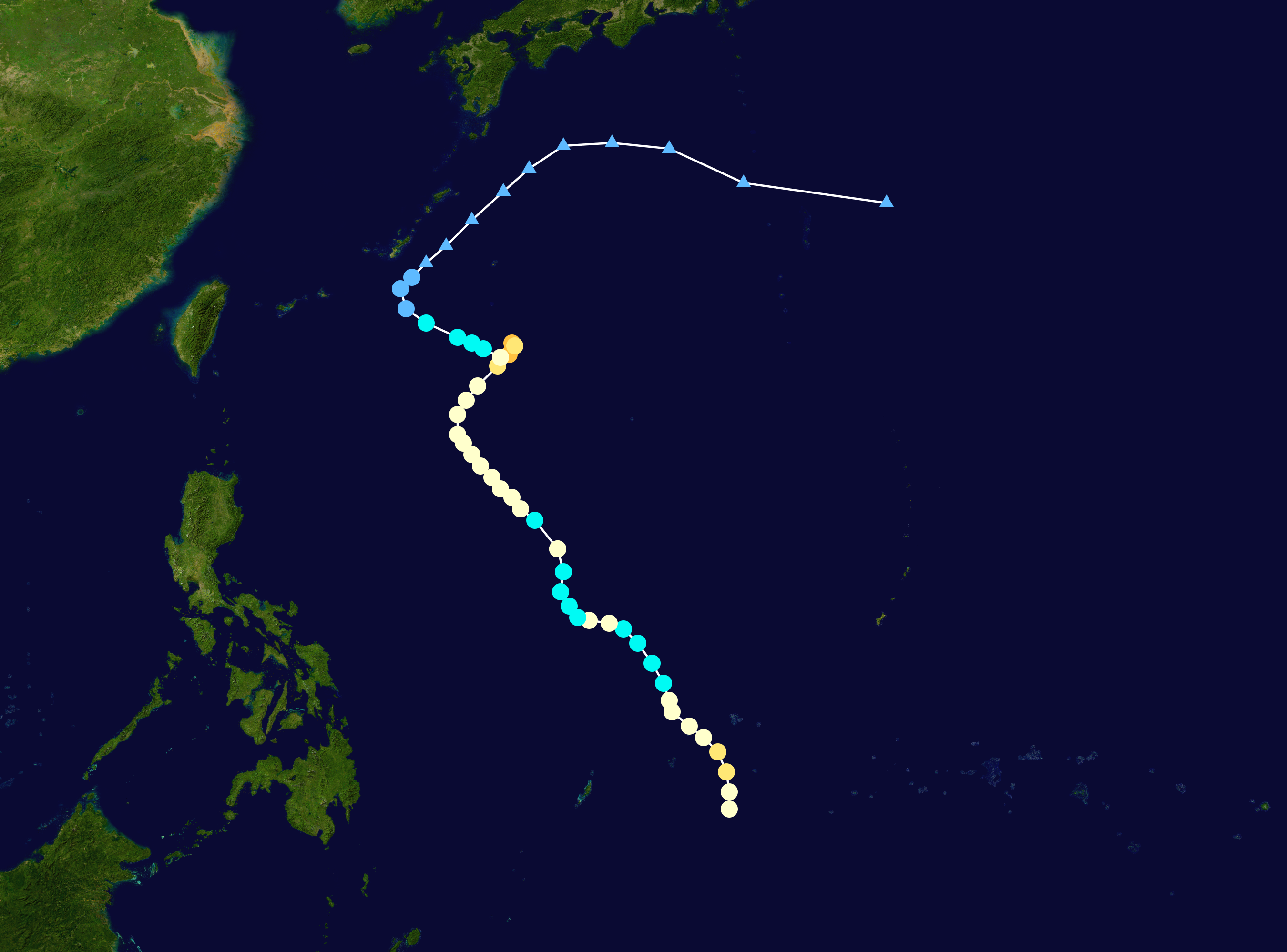
- Duration: April 17 – April 28
- Peak intensity: 185 km/h (115 mph) (1-min); 977 hPa (mbar)

Anita formed as a tropical depression on April 17. Anita entered a phase of warm waters, and it rapidly intensified to a category 1 typhoon and even a category 2 typhoon later. Anita encountered on a phase of cool waters, and as a result, it gradually weakened. Anita but re-intensified into a category 1 typhoon on April 20. However, it weakened again on April 22 but again re-intensified to a category 1 and even a category 2 typhoon later. Anita reached its peak intensity as a category 3 typhoon. Anita encountered a strong wind shear and because of this, Anita rapidly weakened to a tropical storm. Anita weakened to a tropical depression on April 25. Later, Anita loses its identity and dissipated.

=== Typhoon Billie ===
- Typhoon (JMA)
- Category 3 typhoon (SSHWS)
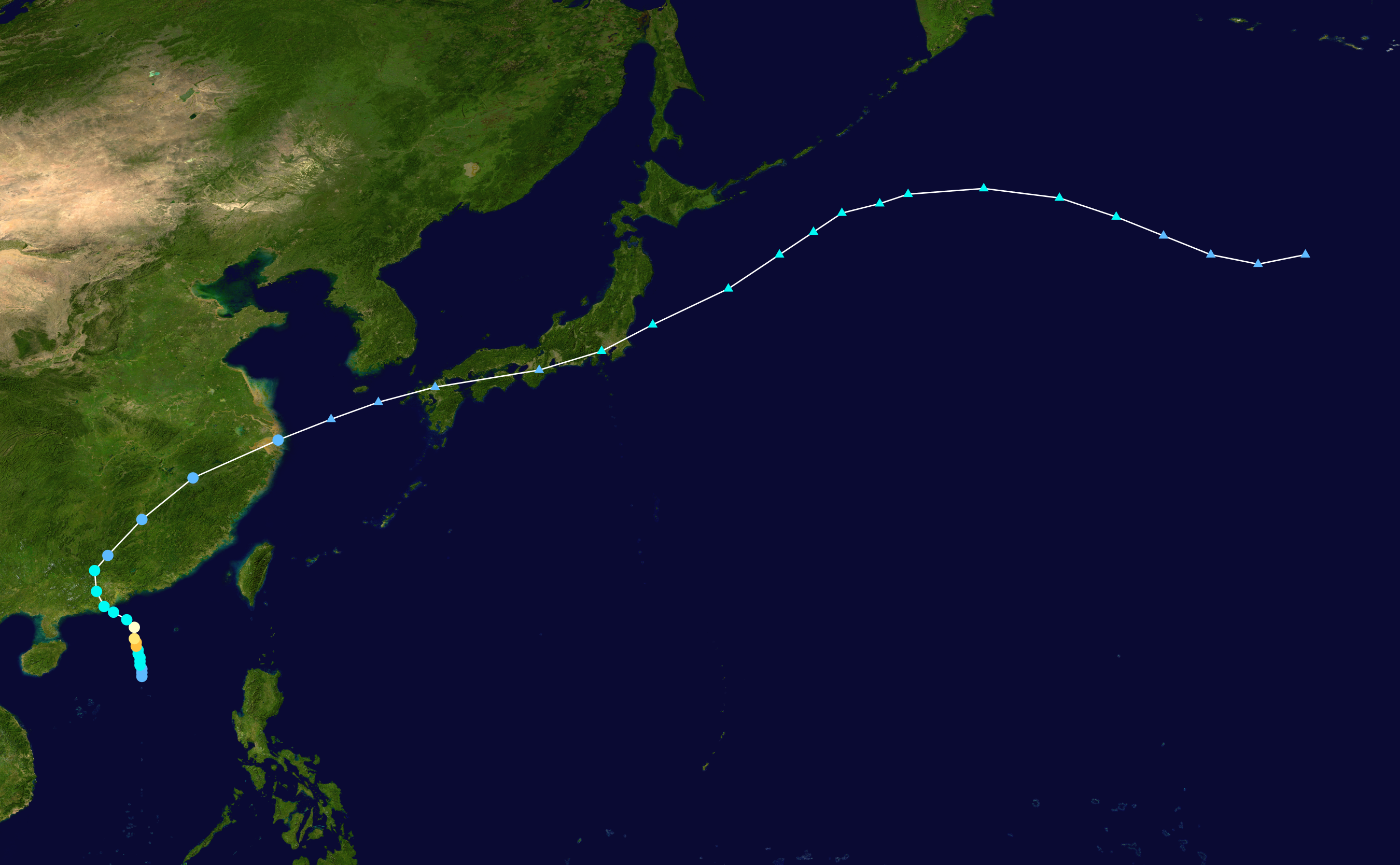
- Duration: June 2 – June 7
- Peak intensity: 185 km/h (115 mph) (1-min); 988 hPa (mbar)

Billie hit China as a weak typhoon.

=== JMA Tropical Storm Six ===
- Tropical storm (JMA)
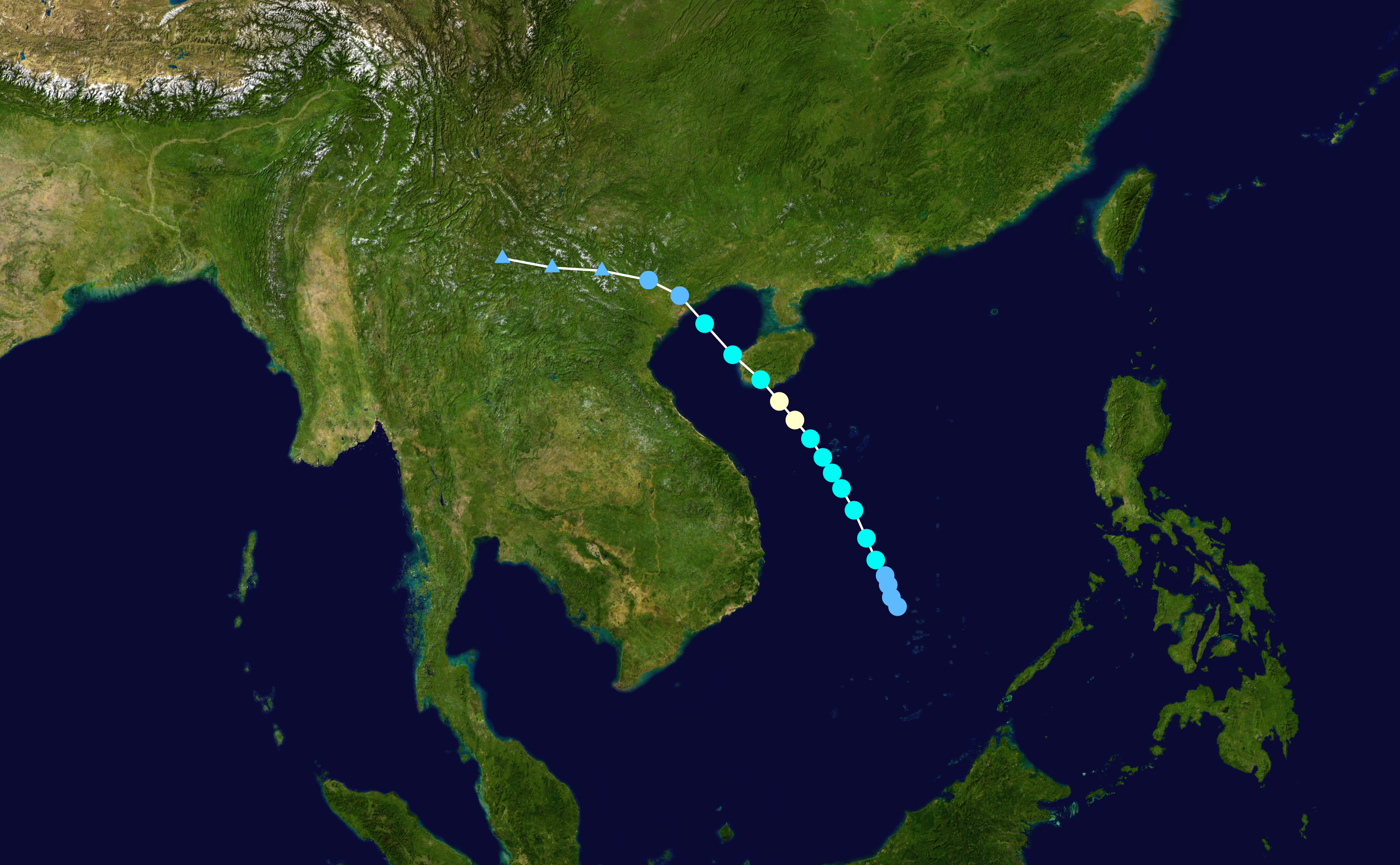
- Duration: June 23 – June 28
- Peak intensity: 105 km/h (65 mph) (10-min); 982 hPa (mbar)

The storm was only tracked by JMA and CMA.

=== Super Typhoon Clara ===
- Typhoon (JMA)
- Category 4 super typhoon (SSHWS)
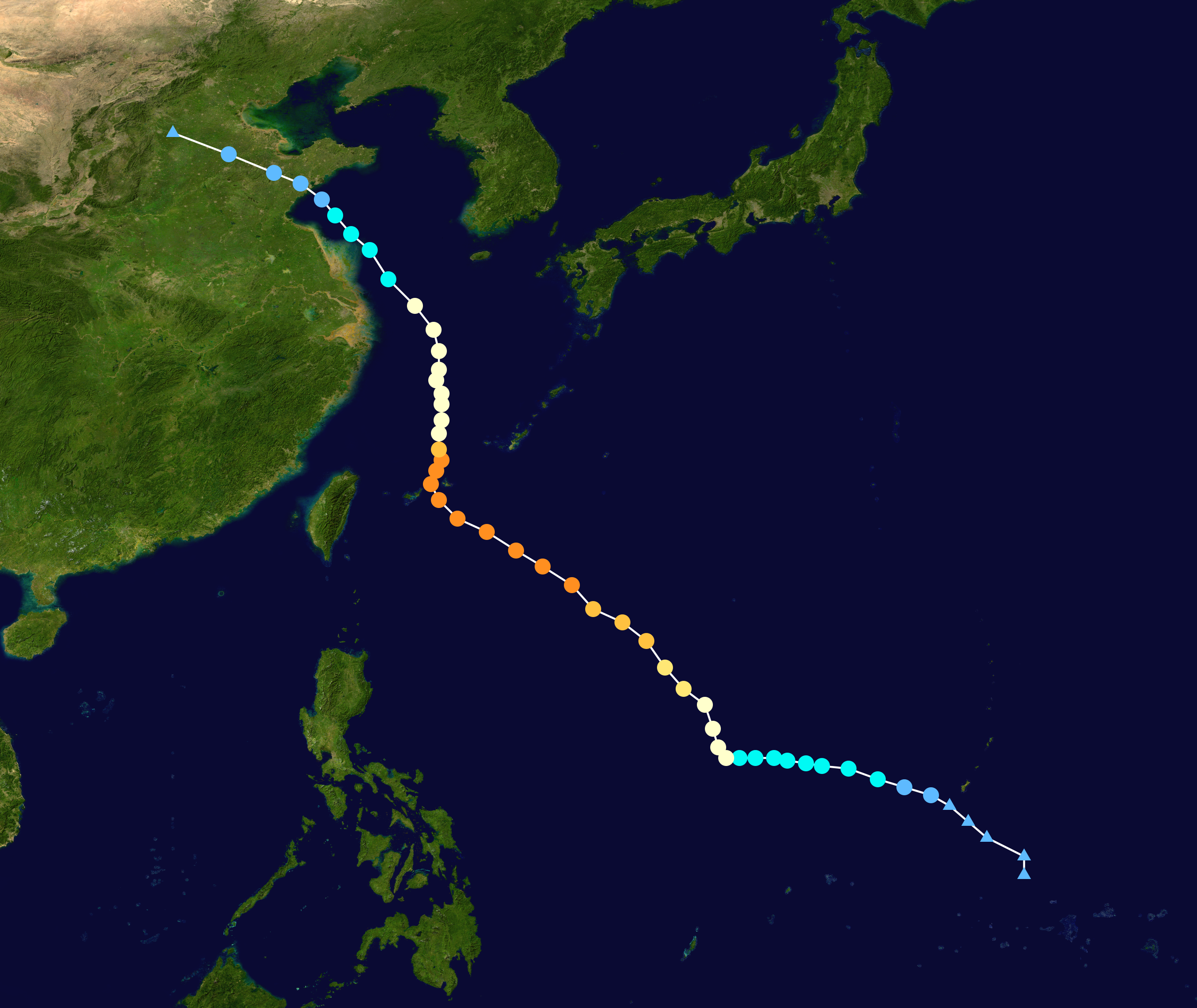
- Duration: July 5 – July 17
- Peak intensity: 250 km/h (155 mph) (1-min); 919 hPa (mbar)

a tropical disturbance formed near Guam and turn tropical storm Clara. It slowly intensify to a category 4 and it made landfall on the Japanese islands as a category 4. It continue going to northeast China and dissipated in mainland China.

=== Typhoon Dot ===
- Tropical storm (JMA)
- Category 1 typhoon (SSHWS)
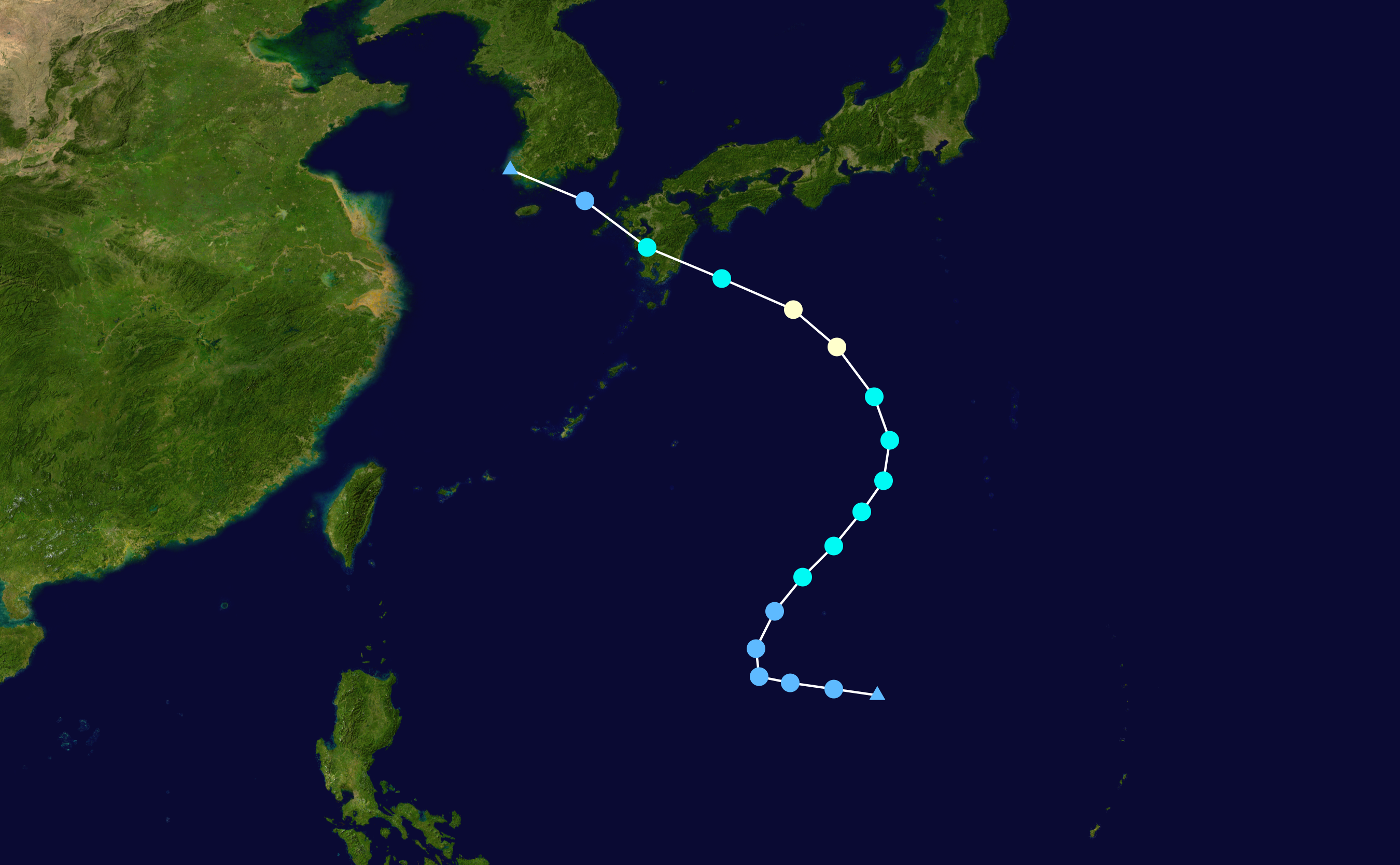
- Duration: July 12 – July 17
- Peak intensity: 130 km/h (80 mph) (1-min); 995 hPa (mbar)

Dot hit Japan as a tropical storm.

=== Typhoon Ellen ===
- Typhoon (JMA)
- Category 1 typhoon (SSHWS)
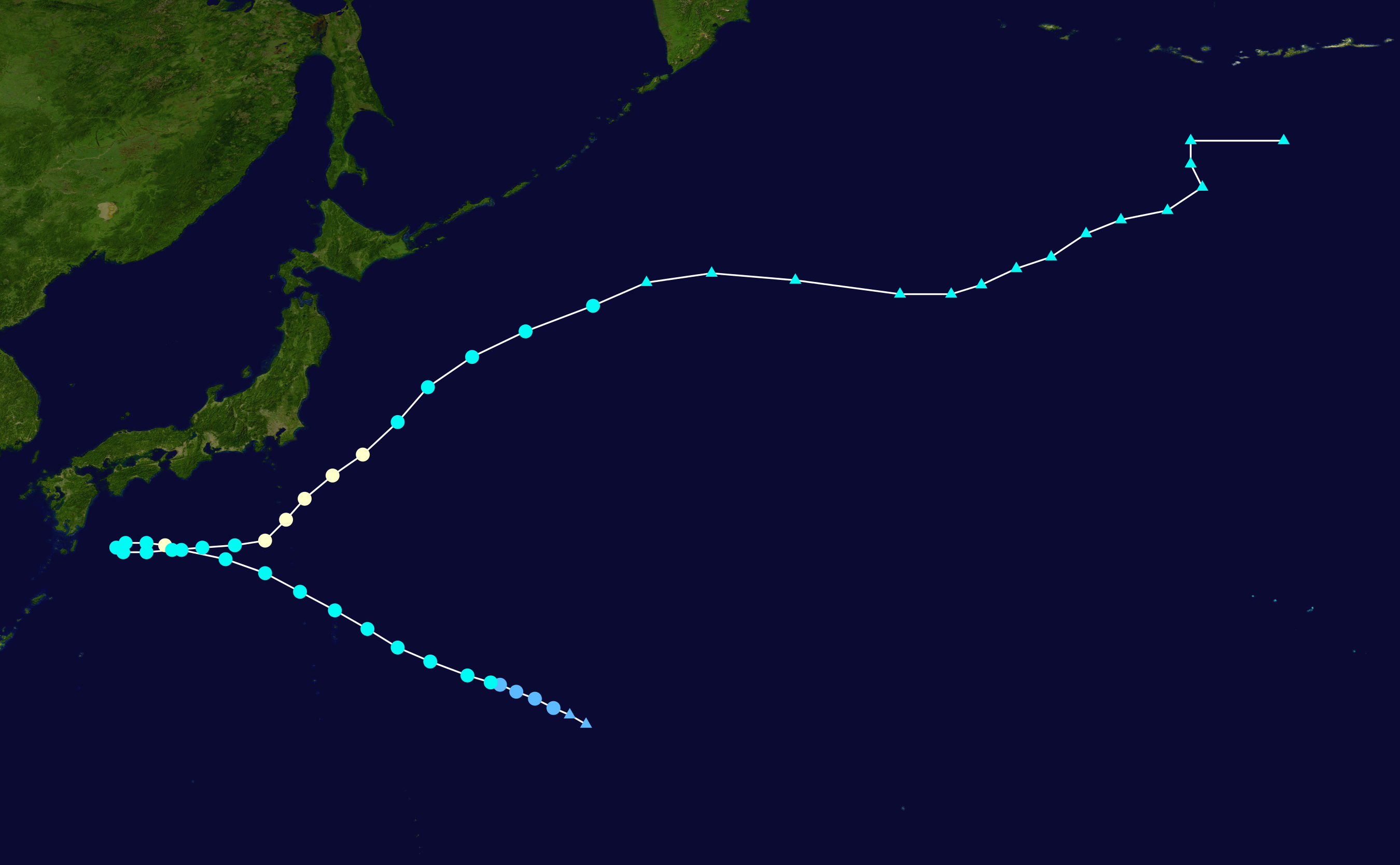
- Duration: July 15 – July 27
- Peak intensity: 130 km/h (80 mph) (1-min); 960 hPa (mbar)

Ellen was a Category 1 typhoon that did not make landfall.

=== Tropical Storm 09W ===
- Tropical storm (JMA)
- Tropical storm (SSHWS)
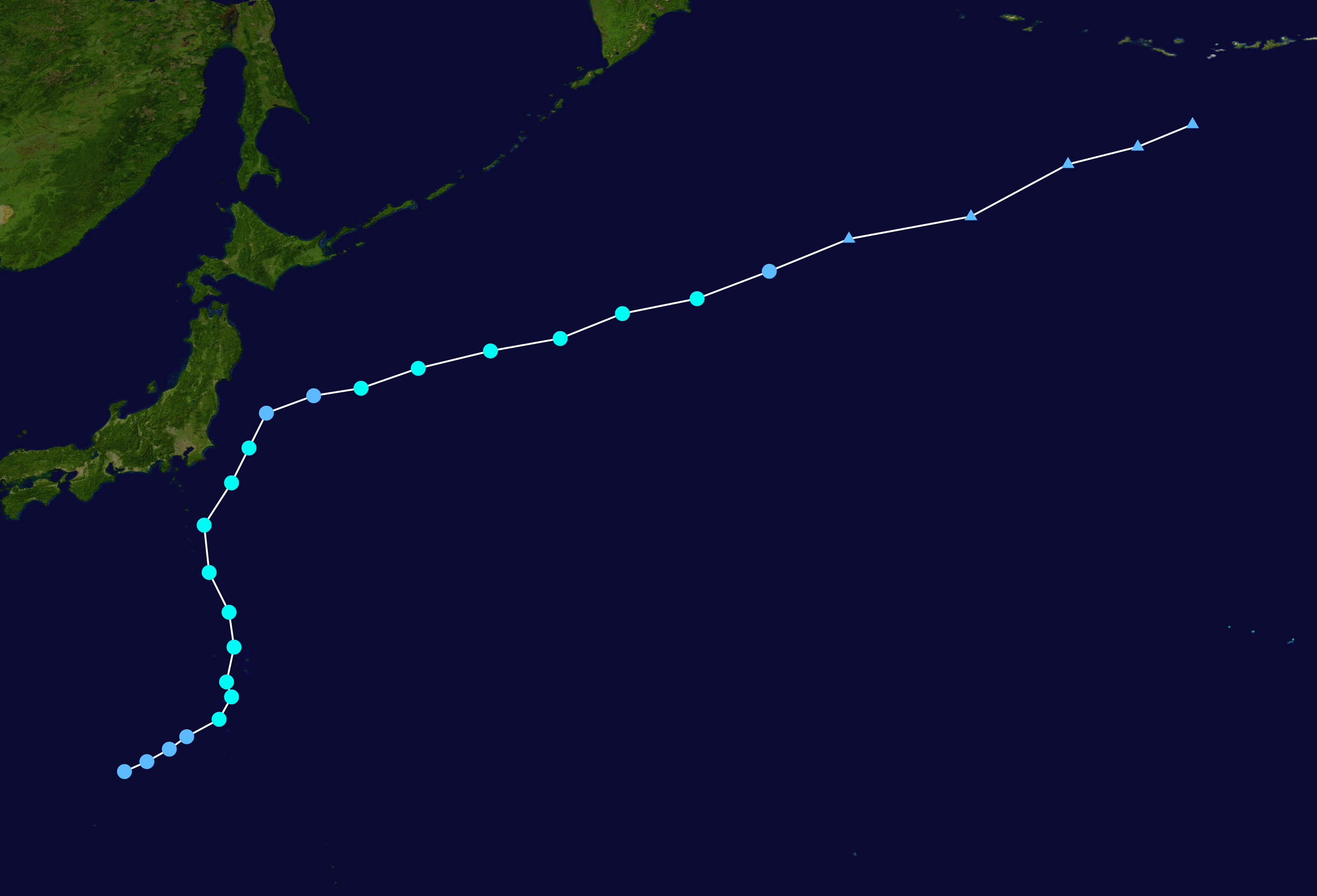
- Duration: July 17 – July 23
- Peak intensity: 95 km/h (60 mph) (1-min); 990 hPa (mbar)

09W didn't made landfall but still affect in Japan.

=== Typhoon Fran ===
- Typhoon (JMA)
- Category 4 typhoon (SSHWS)
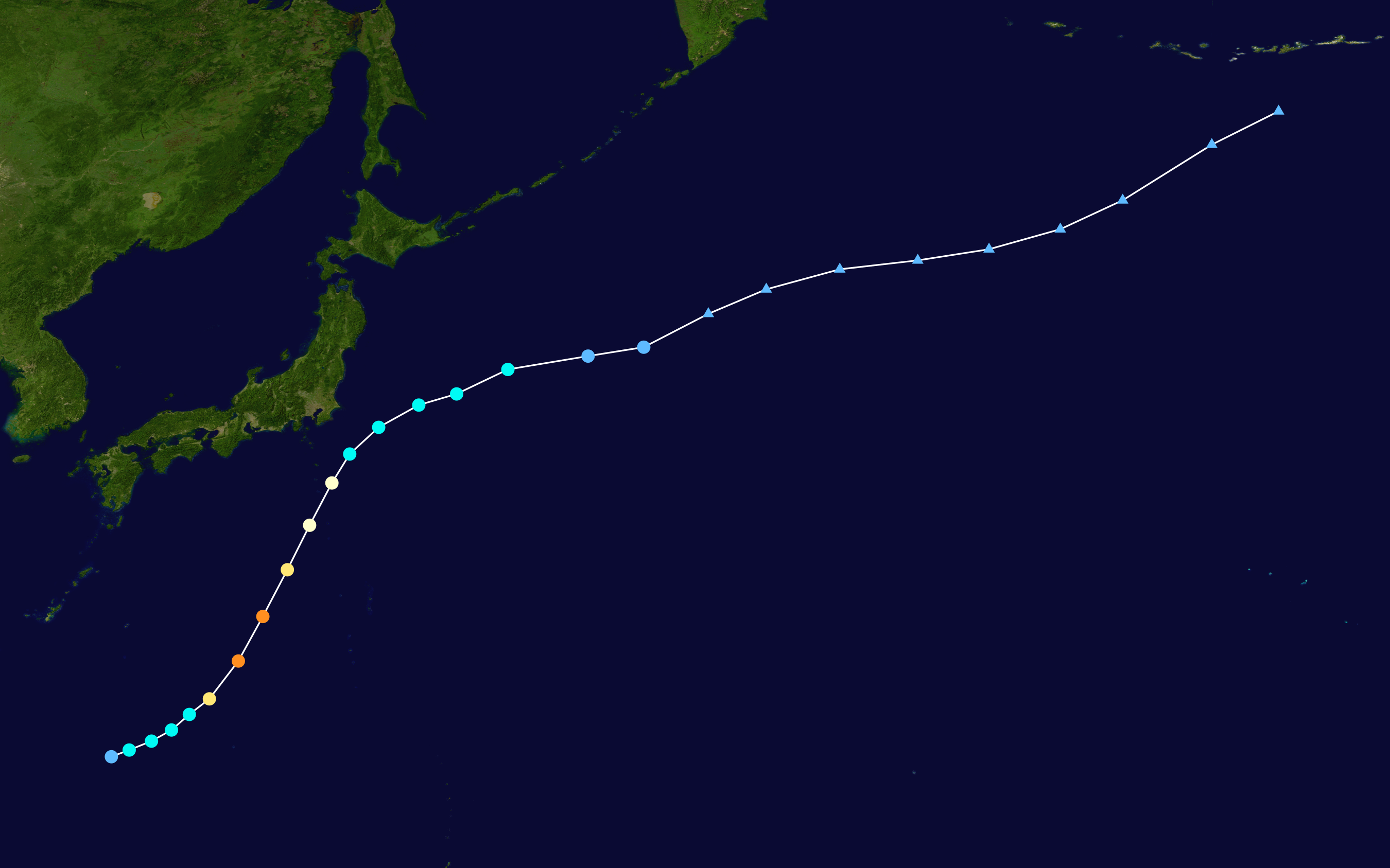
- Duration: July 18 – July 21
- Peak intensity: 215 km/h (130 mph) (1-min); 930 hPa (mbar)

On July 18, a tropical depression formed southeast of Japan. It entered a phase of favorable environments and was soon upgraded into a tropical storm and named Fran. Fran then moved into a favorable environment and Fran was upgraded into a category 1 typhoon. Intensification occurred and Fran intensified from a category 1 to 4 typhoon and reached its peak intensity. After peaking in intensity, unfavorable environments made Fran to start a weakening trend. On July 20, Fran weakened to a category 2 typhoon and later weakened to a category 1 typhoon and even as a strong tropical storm. On July 21 of noon, Fran weakened to a tropical depression, and soon encountered with strong wind shear and dissipated. Fran became extratropical on July 21, before moving further to the east and dissipated on July 23.

=== JMA Tropical Storm Twelve ===
- Tropical storm (JMA)
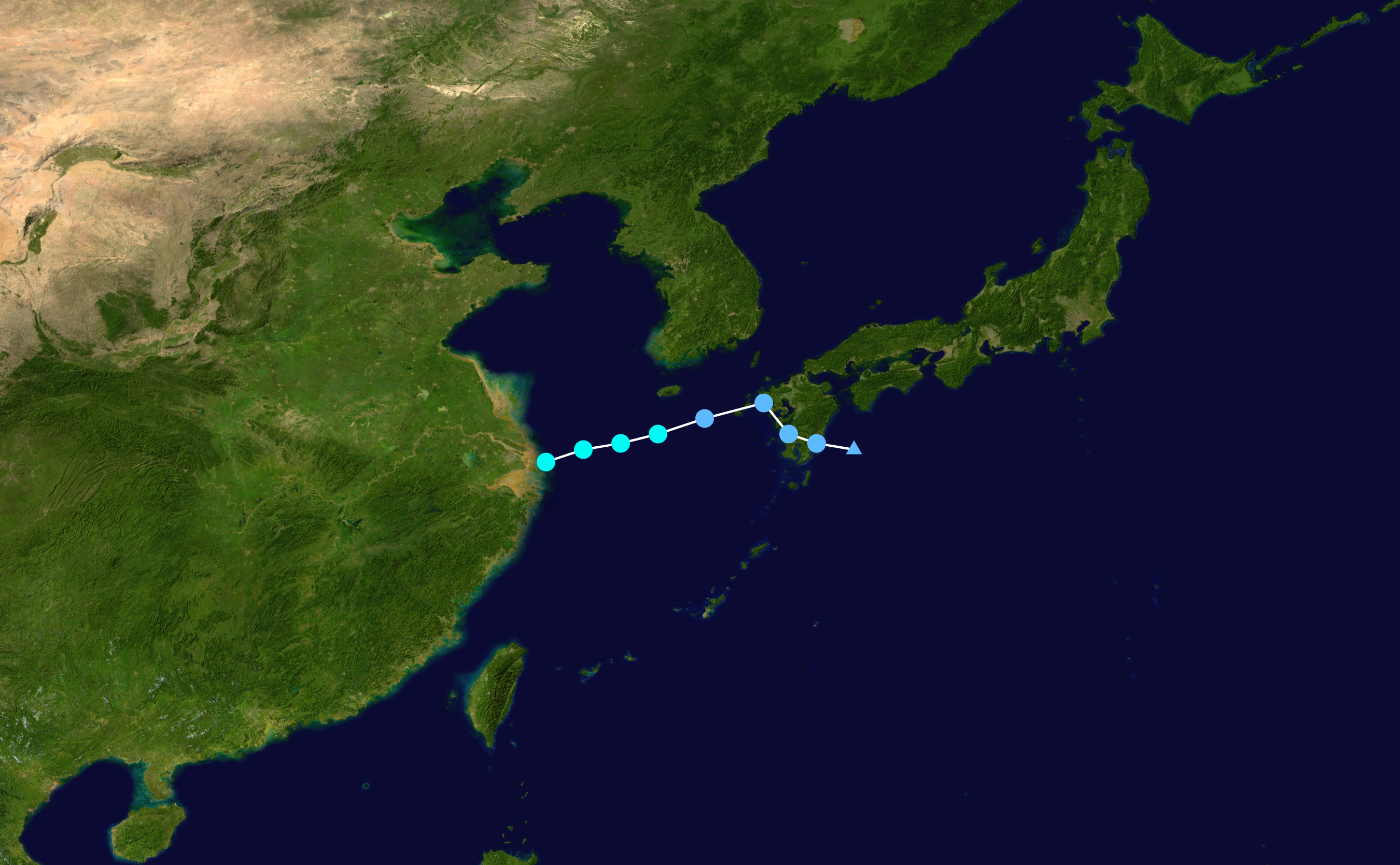
- Duration: July 22 – July 24
- Peak intensity: 65 km/h (40 mph) (10-min); 990 hPa (mbar)

The storm formed east of Shanghai on July 22. Over the next few days, the storm traveled east and made landfall over Kyushu on July 23 as a tropical depression with a pressure of 996 hPa according to JMA. The storm later dissipated on the next day.

=== Typhoon Georgia ===
- Typhoon (JMA)
- Category 4 typhoon (SSHWS)
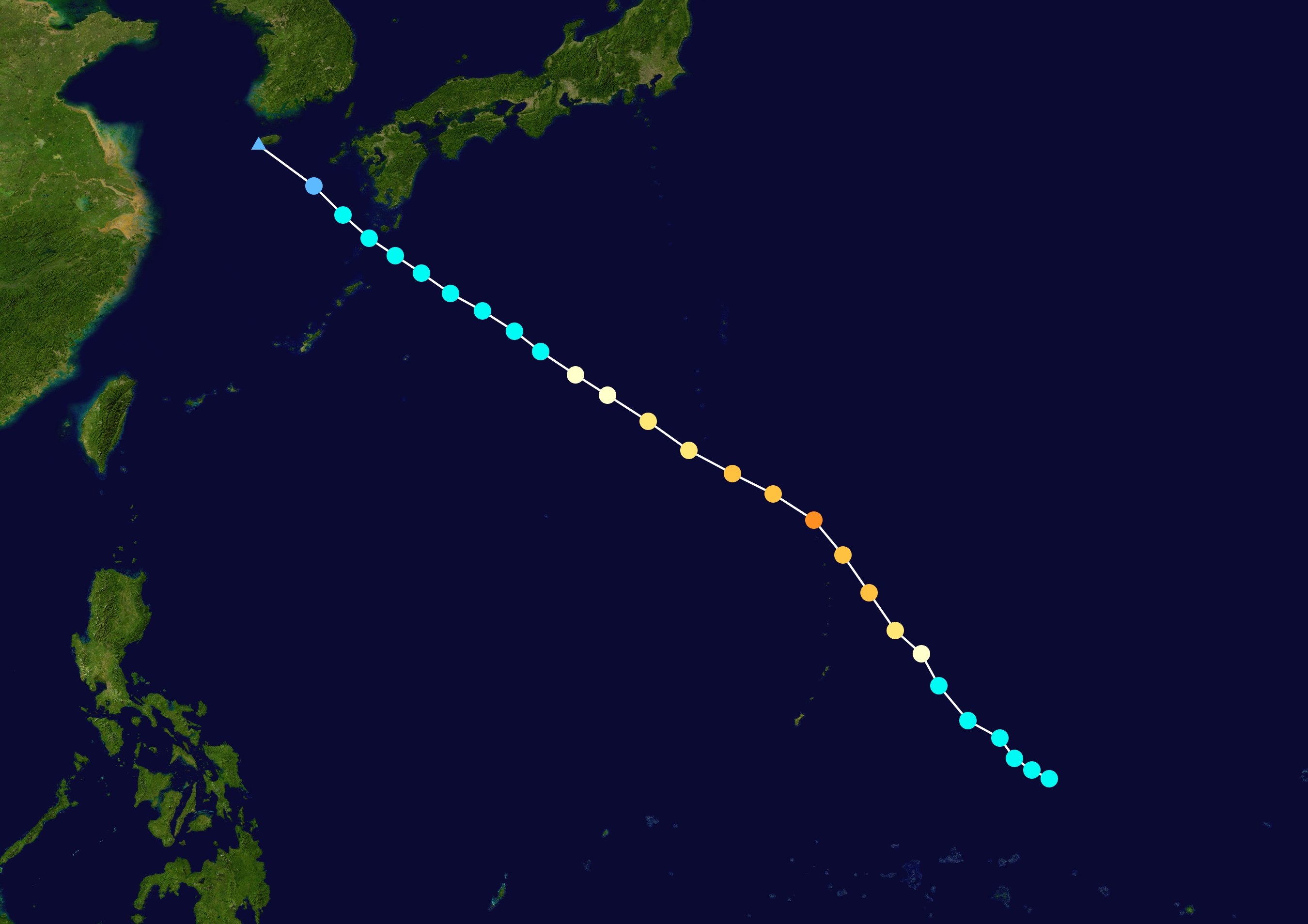
- Duration: July 23 – July 29
- Peak intensity: 215 km/h (130 mph) (1-min); 945 hPa (mbar)

Georgia formed on July 23. It moved northwestward over the following days, intensified into a Category 4 typhoon. However, the storm soon weakened and did not make landfall.

=== JMA Tropical Storm Fifteen ===
- Tropical storm (JMA)
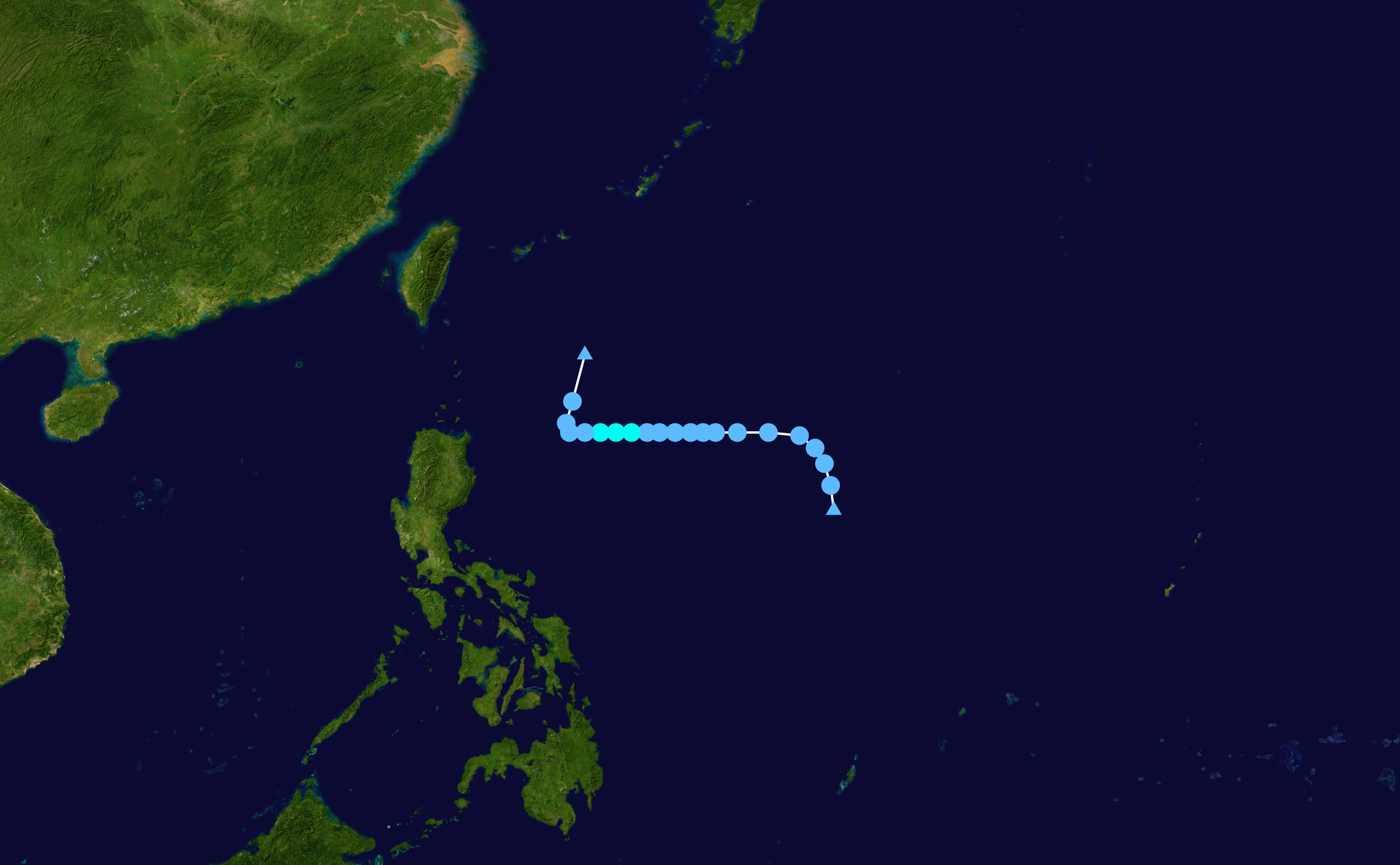
- Duration: August 2 – August 7
- Peak intensity: 75 km/h (45 mph) (10-min); 995 hPa (mbar)

The storm was short-lived and did not make landfall.

=== Typhoon Hope ===
- Typhoon (JMA)
- Category 1 typhoon (SSHWS)
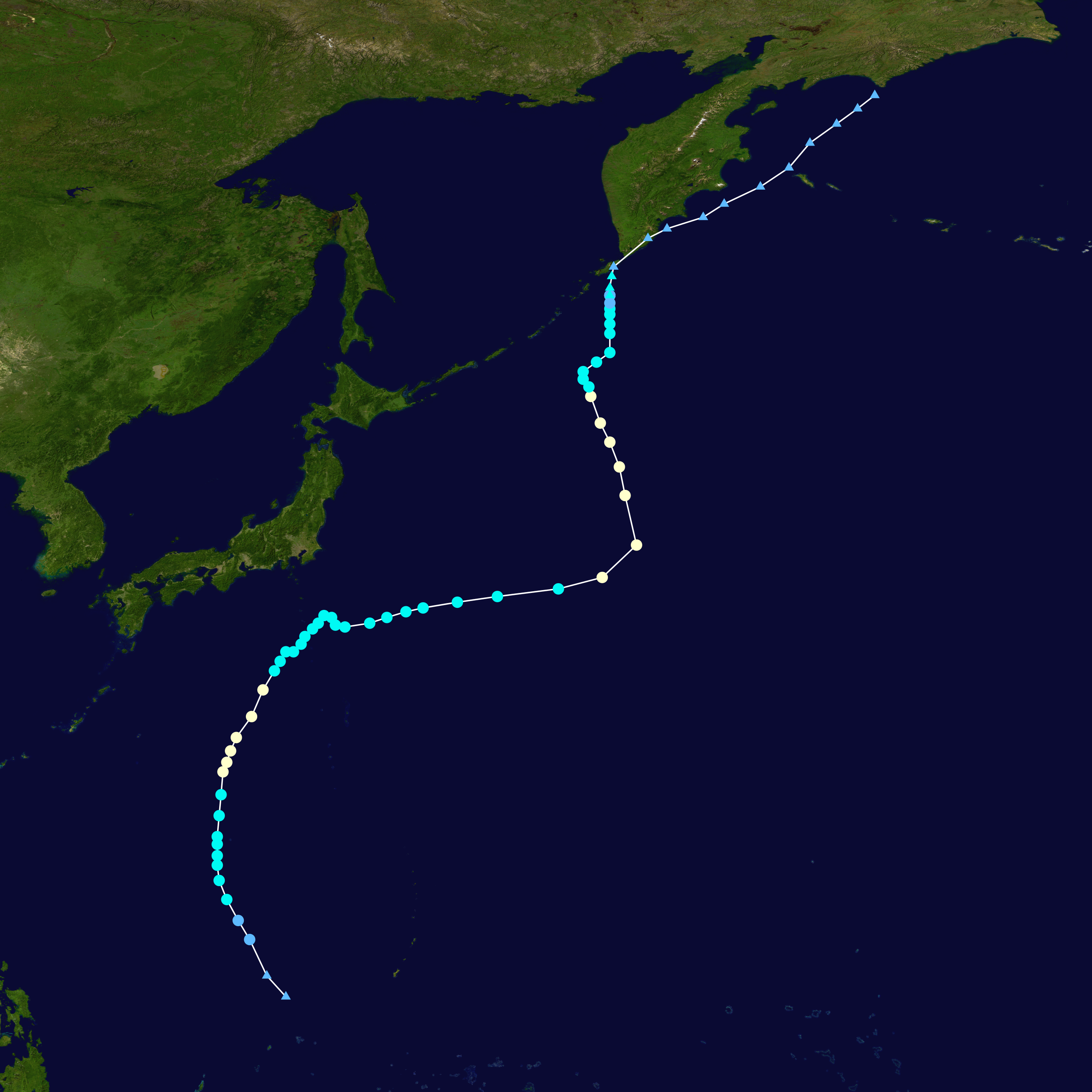
- Duration: August 2 – August 17
- Peak intensity: 140 km/h (85 mph) (1-min); 975 hPa (mbar)

A tropical depression formed east of Philippines on August 2. It intensified to a tropical storm in the next day and named Hope. Hope intensified into a category 1 hurricane while at the south of Japan. It weakened to a tropical storm and the storm turned to the north and intensified into a category 1 again.

It was downgraded to a tropical storm and turned northeast before it slowed down. Hope became extratropical on August 17. Shortly after, the remnants hit the south of Kamchatka Peninsula and dissipated.

=== JMA Tropical Storm Sixteen ===
- Tropical storm (JMA)
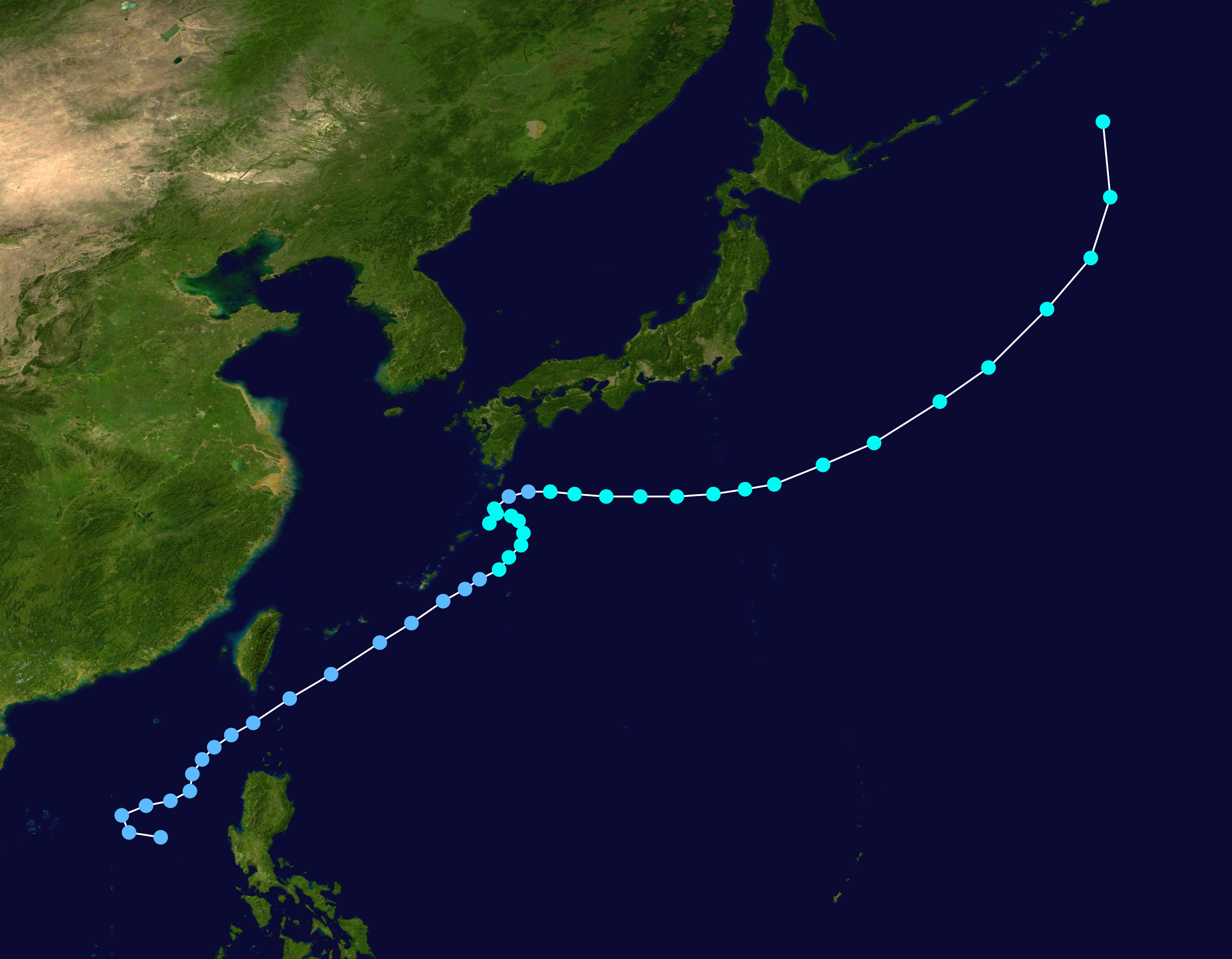
- Duration: August 5 – August 14
- Peak intensity: 105 km/h (65 mph) (10-min); 985 hPa (mbar)

The storm formed on August 5 west of the Philippines. It moved northeastward and intensified into a tropical storm. It dissipated on August 14 without making landfall.

=== JMA Tropical Storm Seventeen ===
- Tropical storm (JMA)
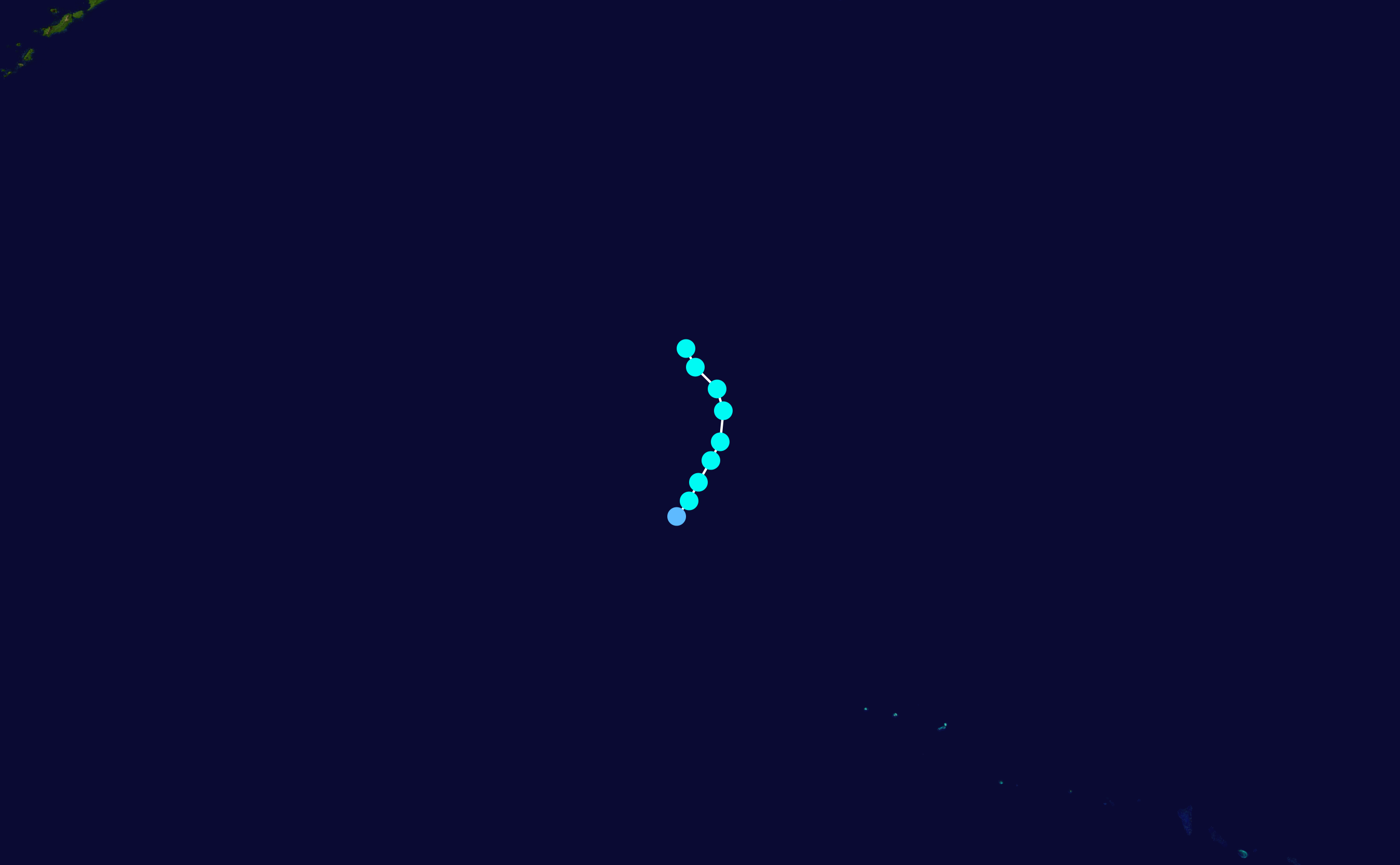
- Duration: August 10 – August 12
- Peak intensity: 75 km/h (45 mph) (10-min); 1000 hPa (mbar)

Seventeen was a short tropical storm that never affected land.

=== JMA Tropical Storm Eighteen ===
- Tropical storm (SSHWS)
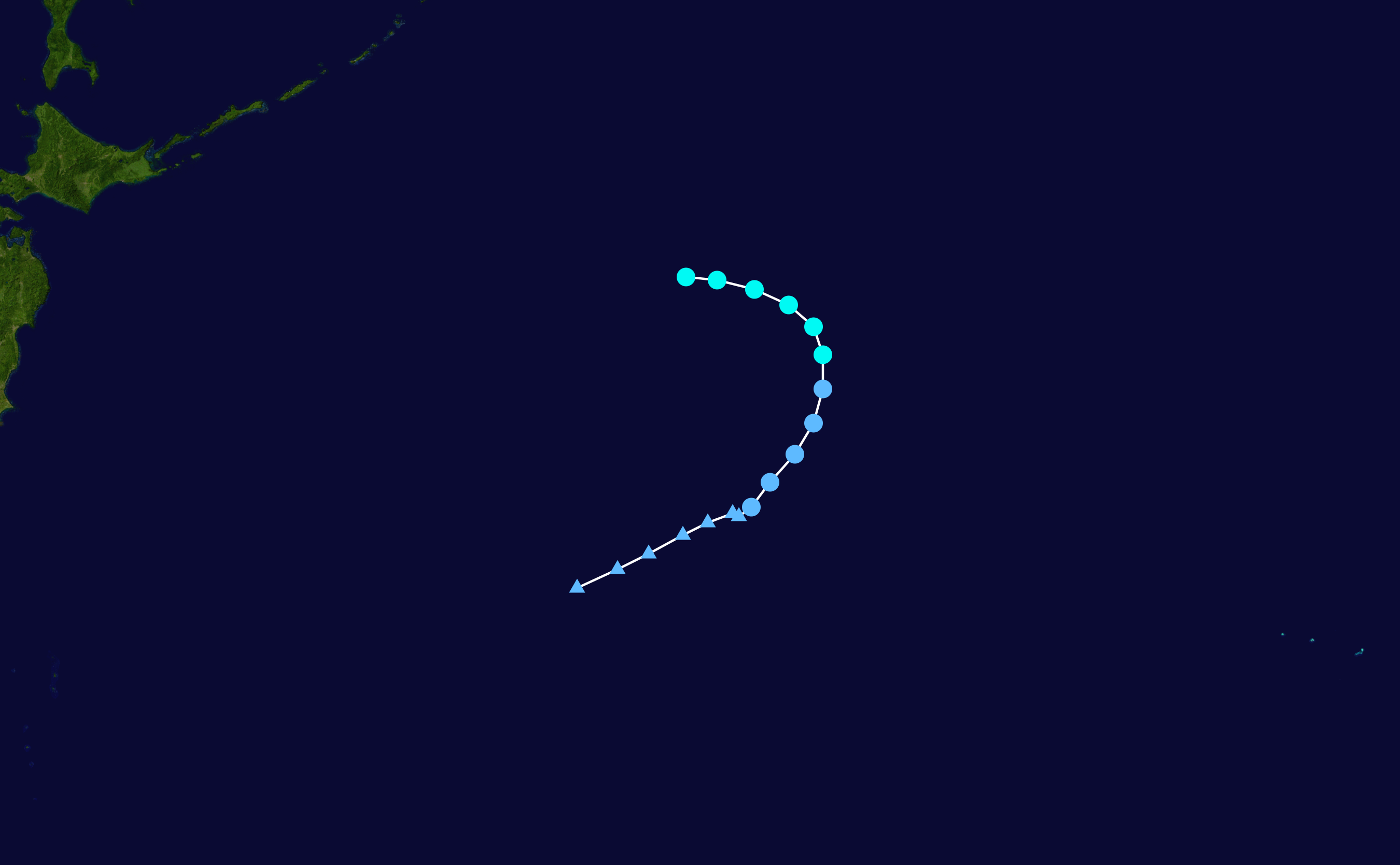
- Duration: August 10 – August 12
- Peak intensity: 65 km/h (40 mph) (1-min); 999 hPa (mbar)

This storm never affected land, it remained in open waters.

=== Typhoon Iris ===
- Typhoon (JMA)
- Category 1 typhoon (SSHWS)
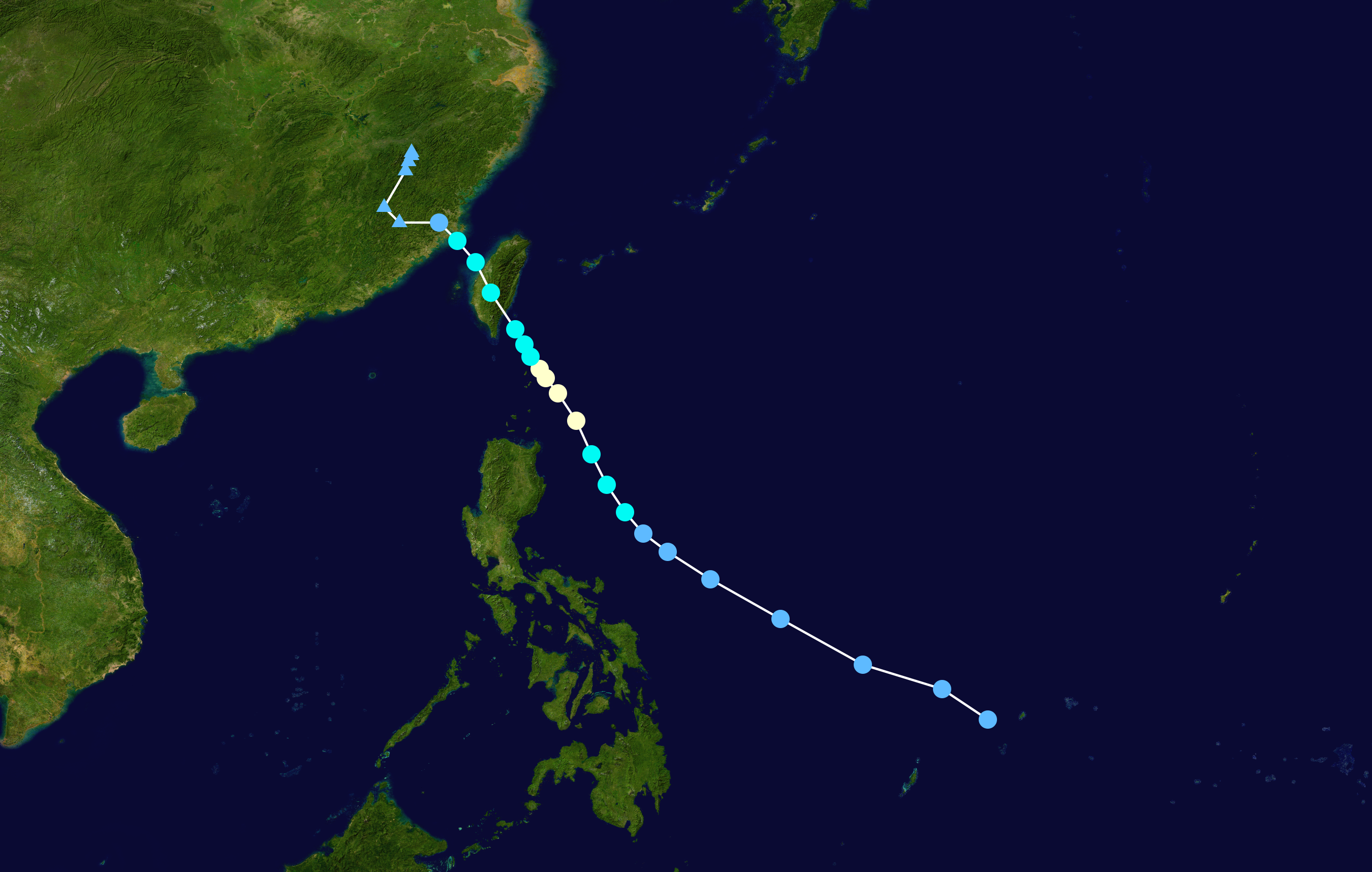
- Duration: August 19 – August 25
- Peak intensity: 150 km/h (90 mph) (1-min); 965 hPa (mbar)

Iris formed east of the Philippines on August 19. The storm traveled northwest, and intensified into a Category 1 typhoon.

=== Typhoon Joan ===
- Typhoon (JMA)
- Category 1 typhoon (SSHWS)
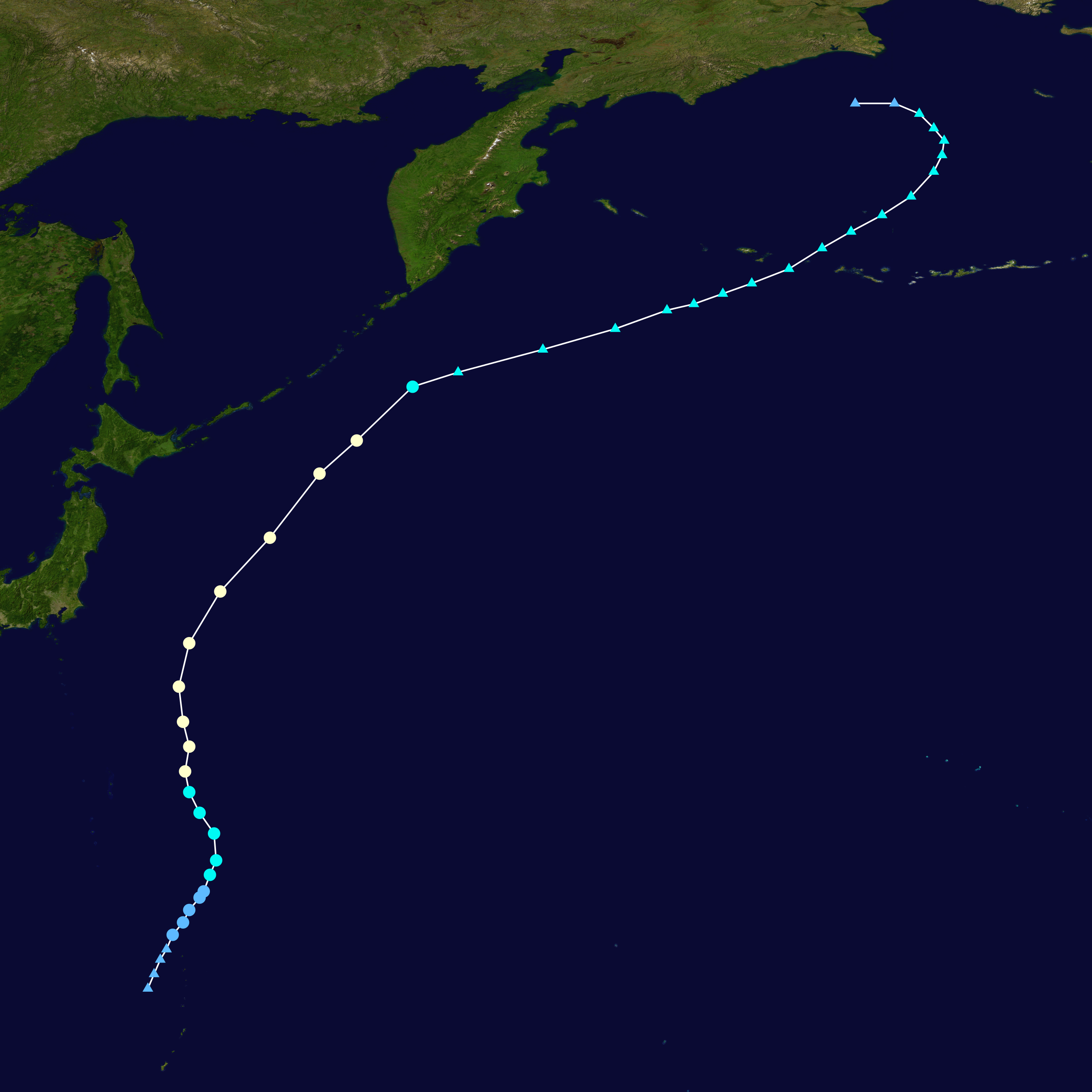
- Duration: August 29 – September 4
- Peak intensity: 150 km/h (90 mph) (1-min); 968 hPa (mbar)

Joan was a Category 1 typhoon that did not affect land.

=== Super Typhoon Kate ===
- Typhoon (JMA)
- Category 4 super typhoon (SSHWS)
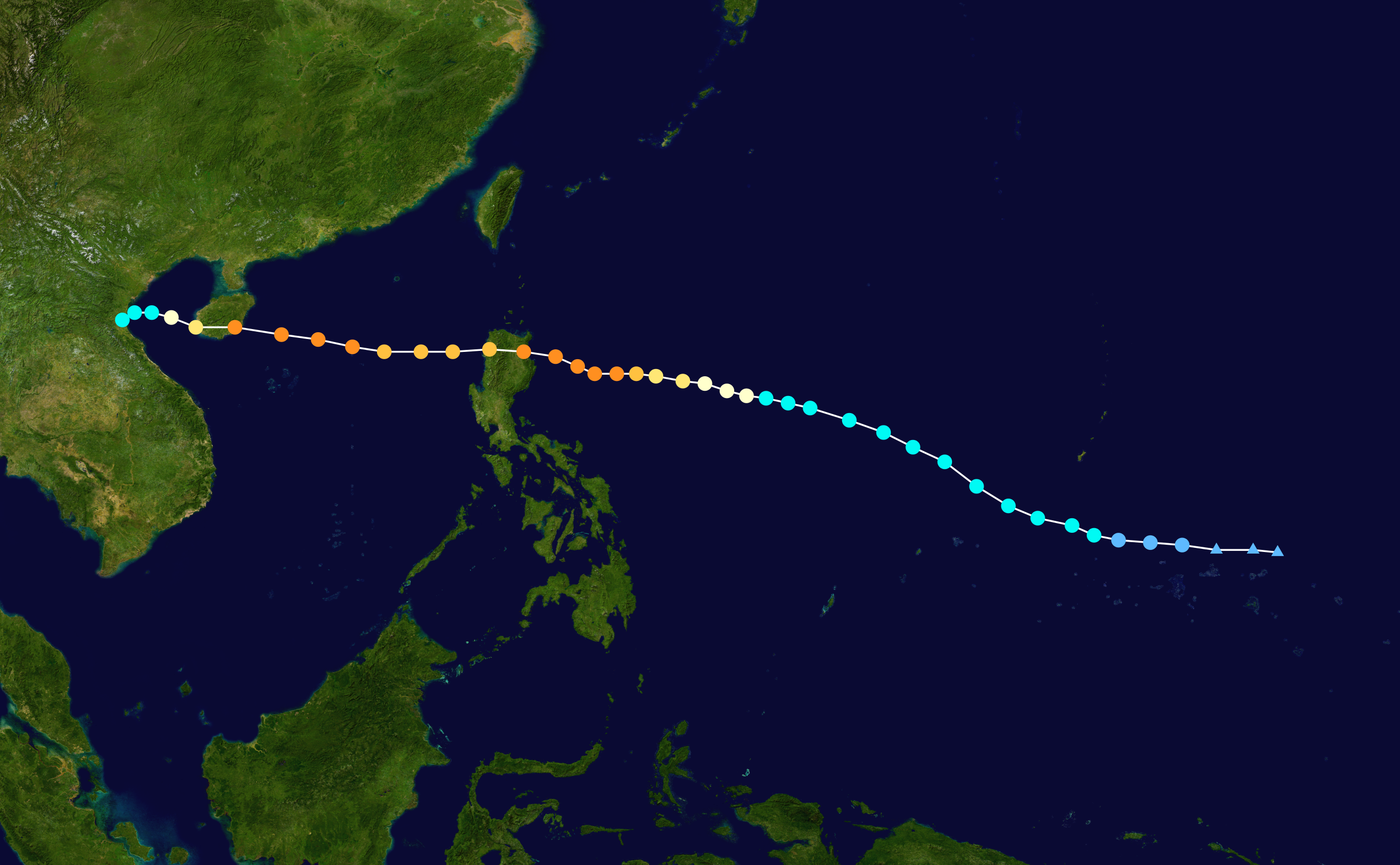
- Duration: September 16 – September 26
- Peak intensity: 250 km/h (155 mph) (1-min); 930 hPa (mbar)

Kate impacted the Philippines and China as a category 4 super typhoon.

Typhoon Kate is believed to have made landfall in the area from Quảng Ninh to Hải Phòng. According to the book Lịch sử đê điều Việt Nam (History of Vietnam’s Dike System) by Trần Lệ Thu (2021), a total of 31 km of sea dikes were eroded or breached; 24,000 hectares of rice fields and other crops were completely destroyed; 7,535 houses were swept away; and many people died due to storm-surge flooding, with 634 people reported to have drowned during the typhoon. According to the newspaper Công an nhân dân (Public Security News), in Hải Phòng alone, there were 669 deaths and 1,200 injuries.

=== Super Typhoon Louise ===
- Typhoon (JMA)
- Category 5 super typhoon (SSHWS)
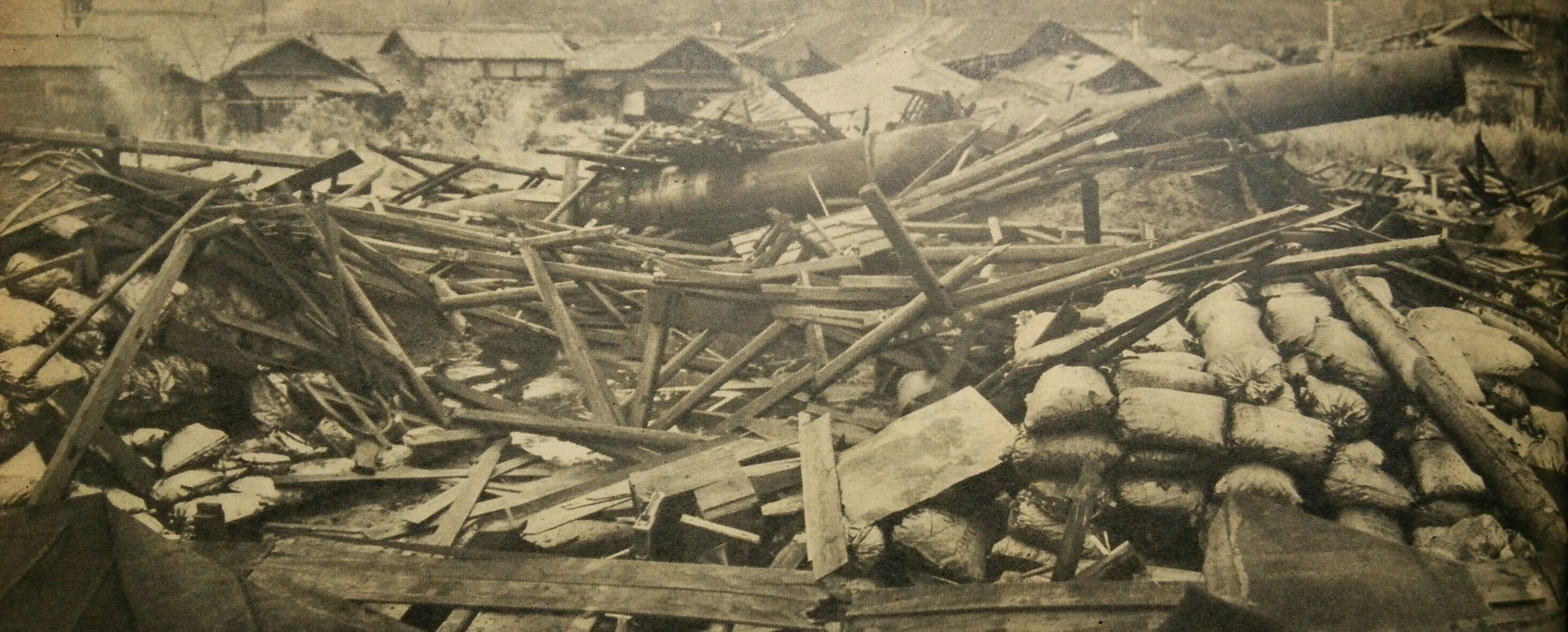
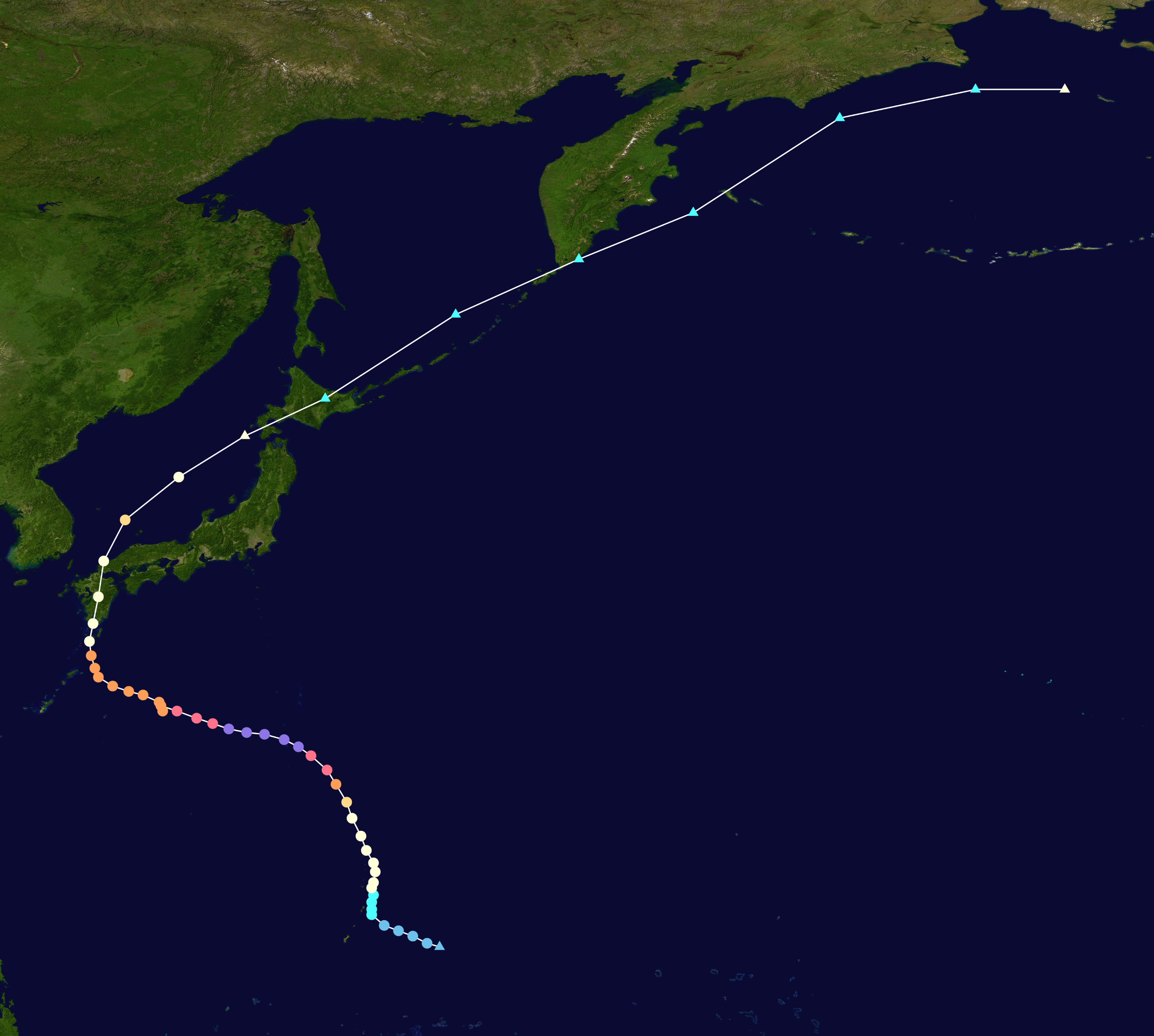
- Duration: September 20 – September 30
- Peak intensity: 280 km/h (175 mph) (1-min); 930 hPa (mbar)

Louise formed on September 20 as a weak tropical depression. It intensified into a tropical storm and even a typhoon later. Wind shear quickly decreased and sea surface temperatures began to rise and Louise rapidly intensified into a category 5 super typhoon. However, the process of eyewall replacement cycle caused Louise to weaken. Louise weakened to a category 2 typhoon and it started to affect the Kyūshū island of Japan and even weakened to a category 1 typhoon and affected Japan. Louise dissipated on September 30. On Kyūshū island, 31 people were killed, 41 went missing, 241 injured and 197,429 persons affected either through loss of homes or flooding. Total property damage was estimated as approaching $30,000,000.

A disastrous by-product of the storm was the fire that swept through the business district of the Honshu seaport city of Niigata on the morning of October 2. More than 1,100 buildings were burned when strong winds whipped what would have been a minor fire across the city. There was no loss of life, however. United States Air Force personnel from their base outside the city joined in aiding victims of the fire.

=== Typhoon Marge ===
- Typhoon (JMA)
- Category 3 typhoon (SSHWS)
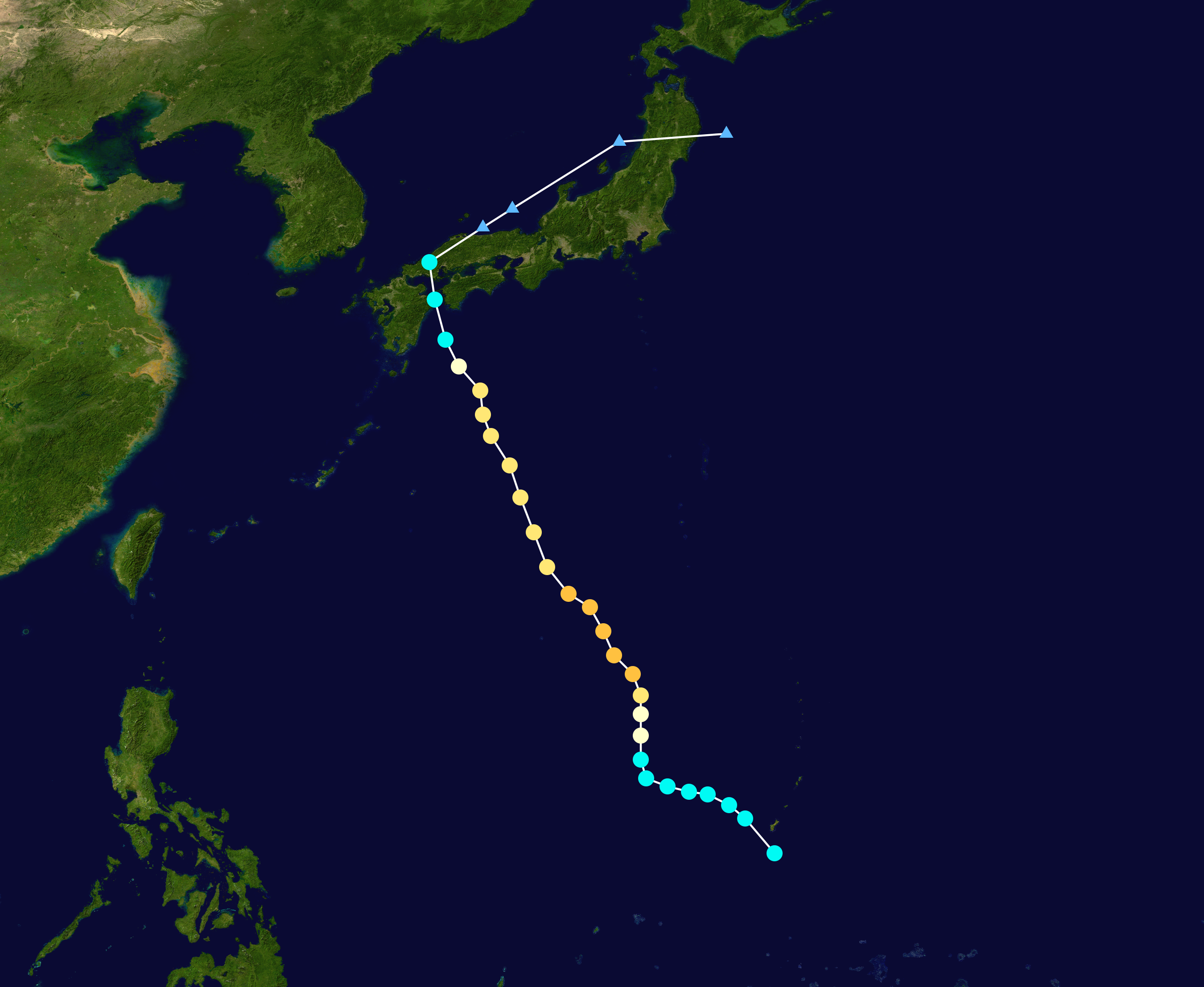
- Duration: September 27 – October 5
- Peak intensity: 185 km/h (115 mph) (1-min); 964 hPa (mbar)

Marge hit Japan as a tropical storm.

=== JMA Tropical Storm Twenty-four ===
- Tropical storm (JMA)
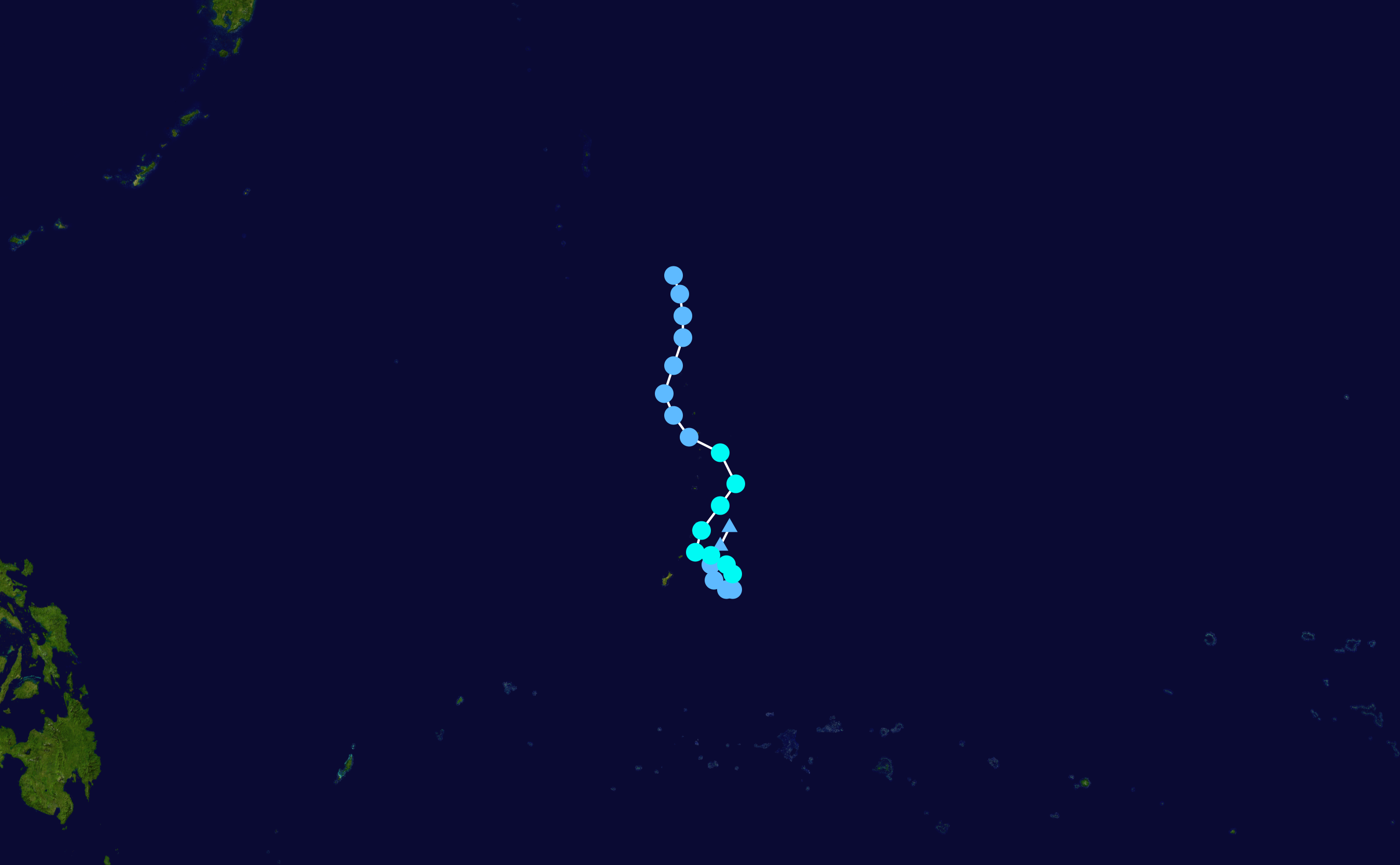
- Duration: October 1 – October 7
- Peak intensity: 75 km/h (45 mph) (10-min); 1003 hPa (mbar)

The storm was weak and did not affect land.

=== Tropical Storm 17W ===
- Tropical depression (JMA)
- Tropical storm (SSHWS)
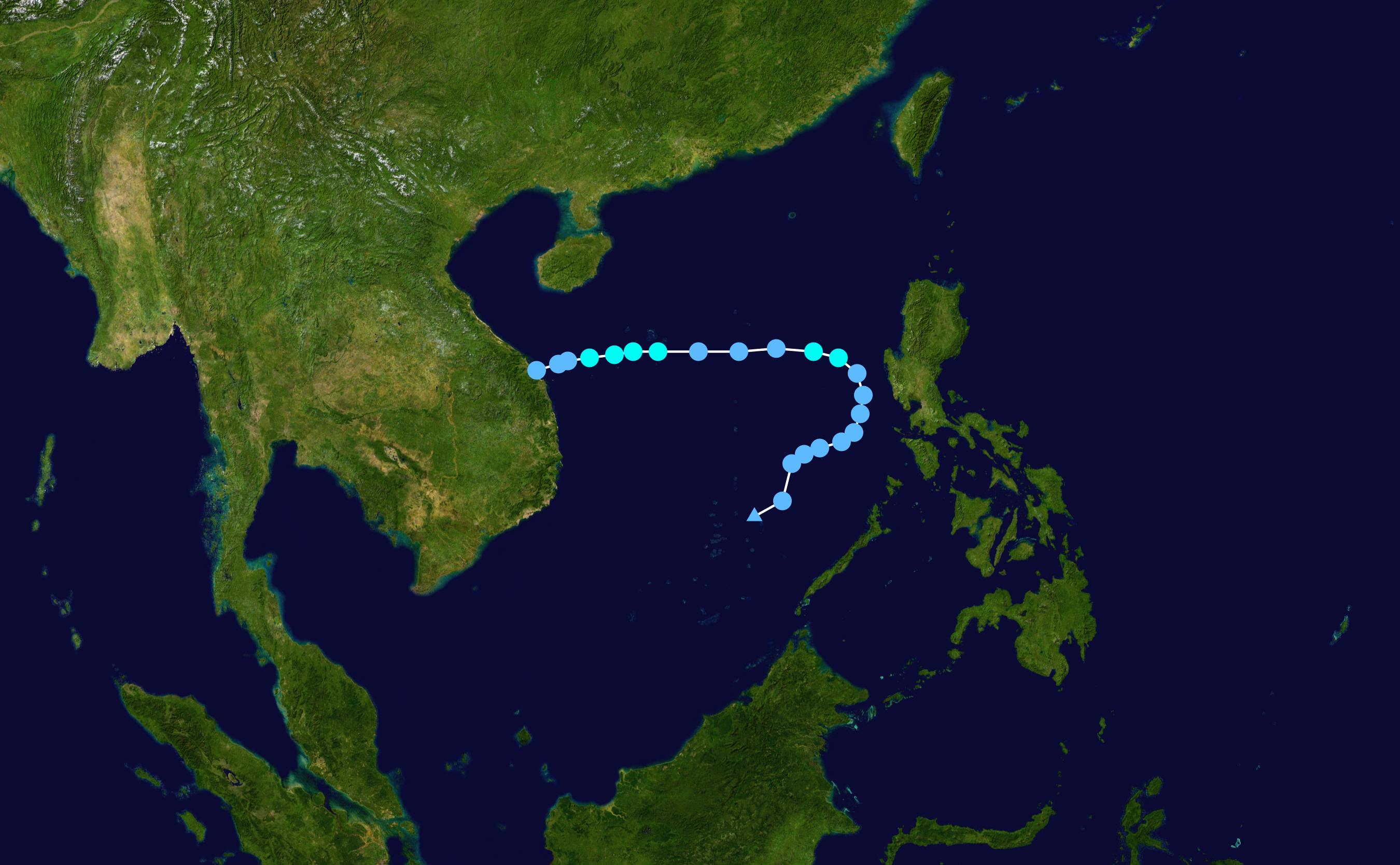
- Duration: October 3 – October 8
- Peak intensity: 75 km/h (45 mph) (1-min); 998 hPa (mbar)

17W formed in the South China Sea and hit Vietnam.

=== Typhoon Nora ===
- Typhoon (JMA)
- Category 2 typhoon (SSHWS)
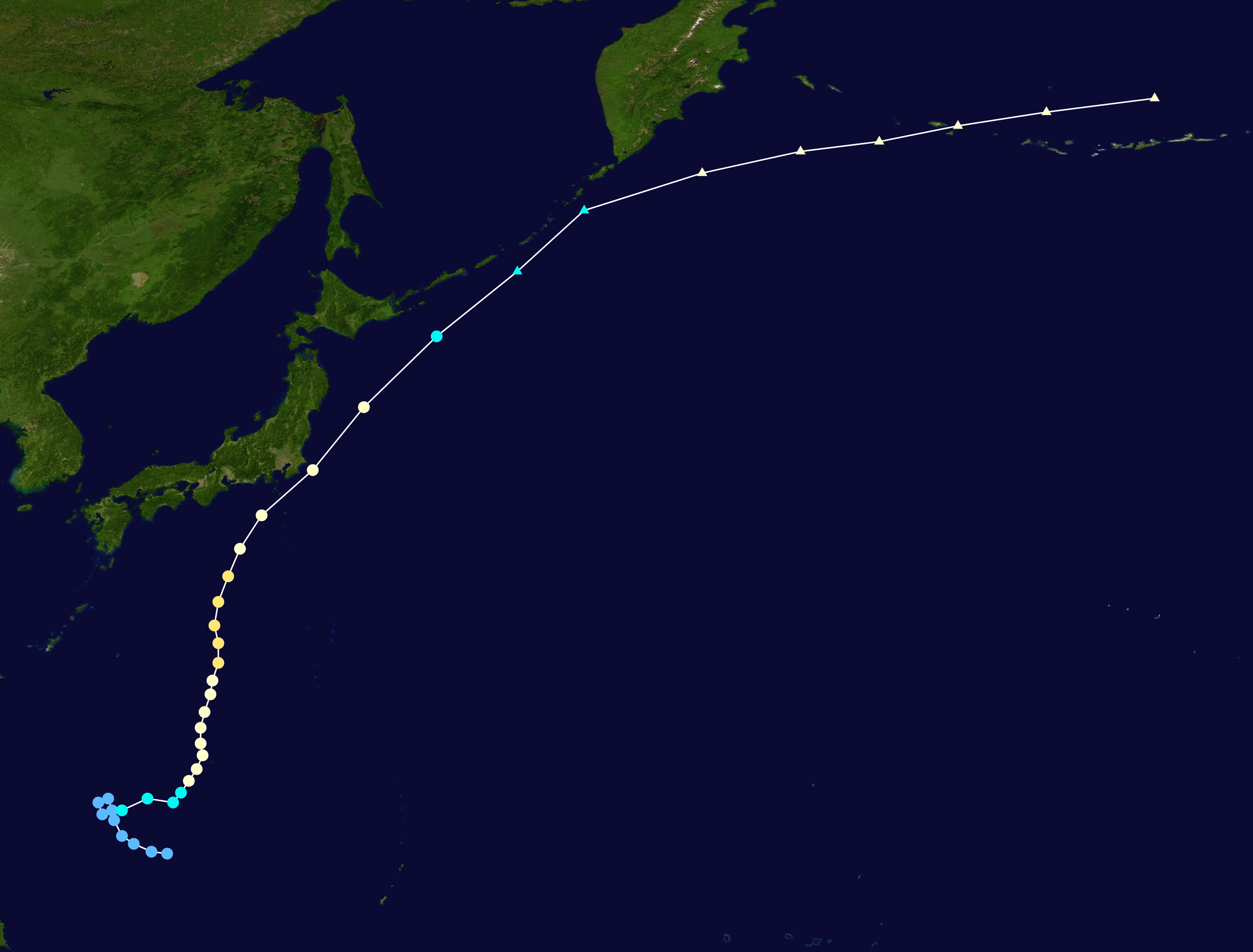
- Duration: October 4 – October 13
- Peak intensity: 175 km/h (110 mph) (1-min); 955 hPa (mbar)

Nora was a Category 2 typhoon. It passed Japan in a very close distance but did not make landfall.

=== Typhoon Opal ===
- Typhoon (JMA)
- Category 2 typhoon (SSHWS)
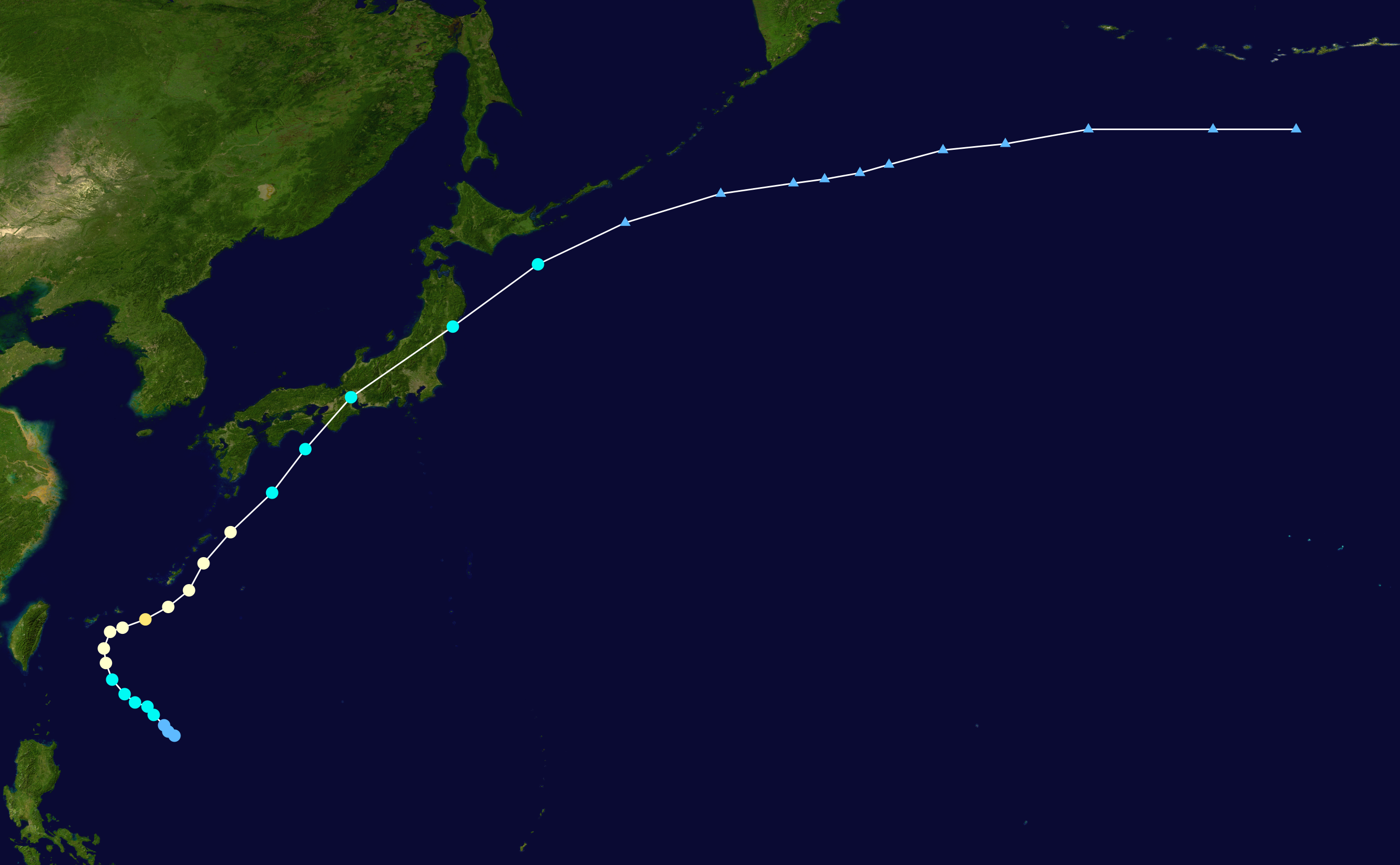
- Duration: October 15 – October 23
- Peak intensity: 155 km/h (100 mph) (1-min); 982 hPa (mbar)

Opal hit Japan as a tropical storm.

=== Tropical Storm 20W ===
- Tropical storm (JMA)
- Tropical storm (SSHWS)
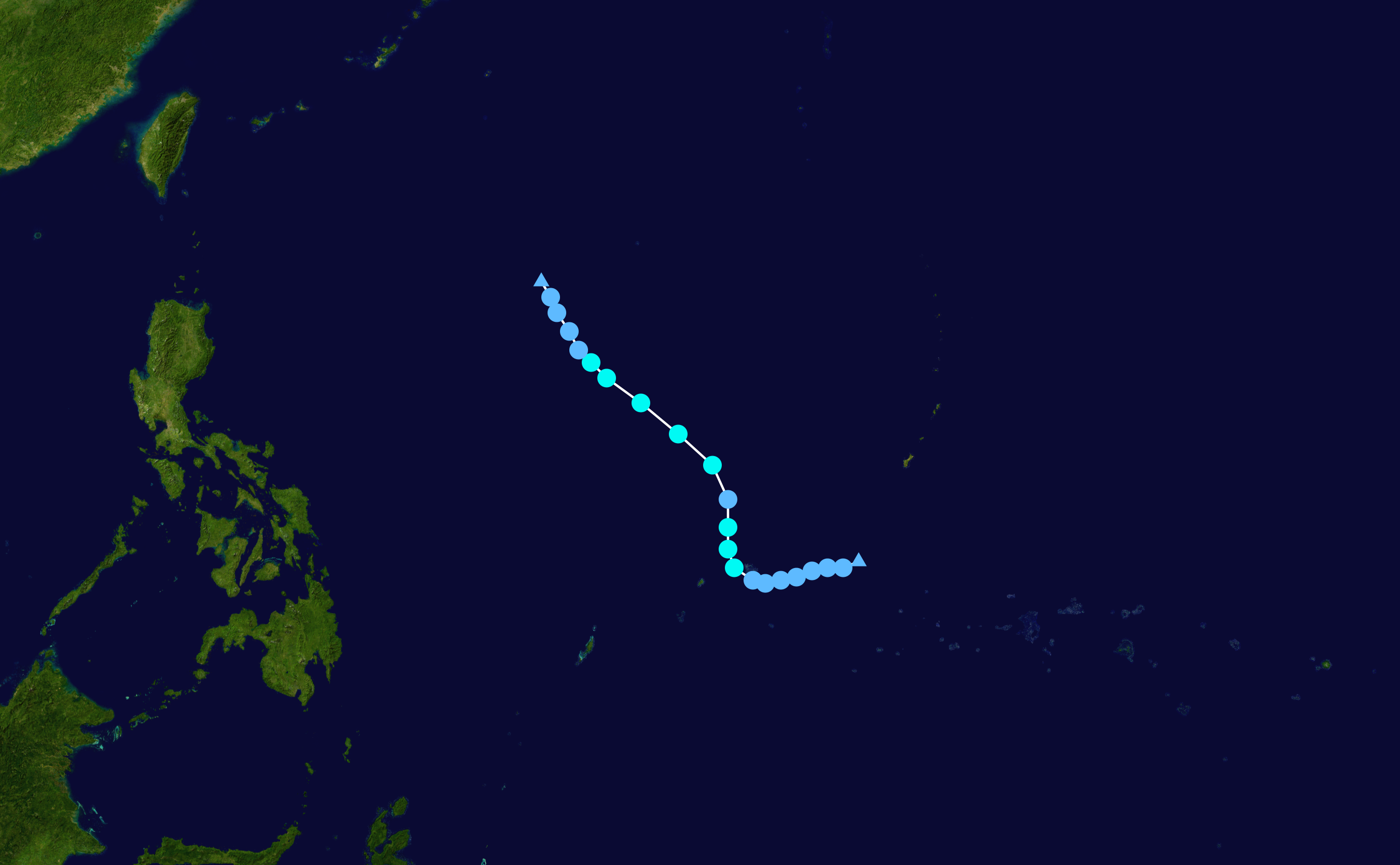
- Duration: October 22 – October 27
- Peak intensity: 75 km/h (45 mph) (1-min); 1004 hPa (mbar)

20W was a weak tropical storm that stayed out at sea.

=== Super Typhoon Patsy ===
- Typhoon (JMA)
- Category 4 super typhoon (SSHWS)
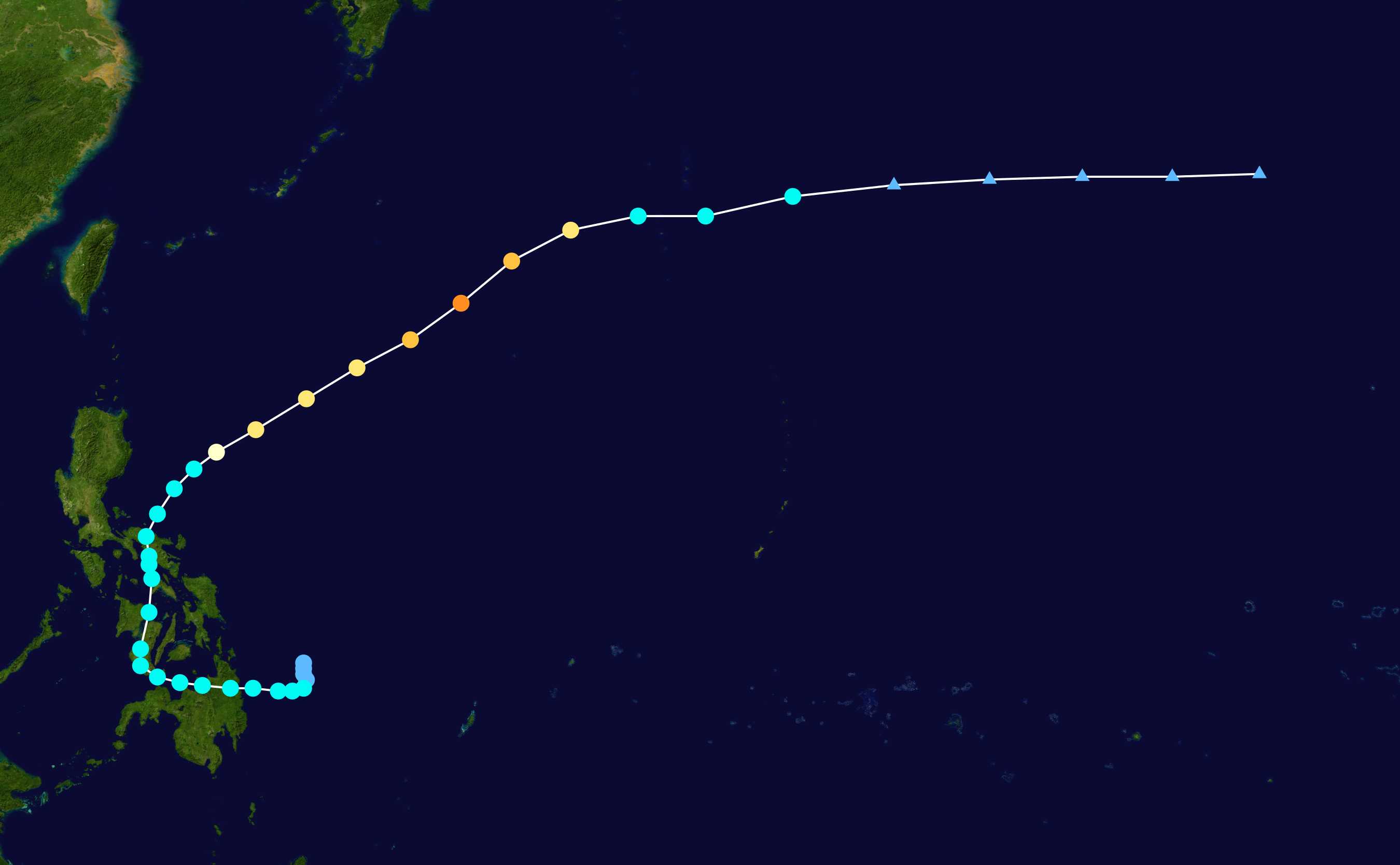
- Duration: November 25 – December 4
- Peak intensity: 250 km/h (155 mph) (1-min); 940 hPa (mbar)

Patsy started on its life as a tropical depression on November 25. It hit Philippines as a tropical storm. It moved out of area before intensifying into Typhoon Patsy. Patsy reached its peak intensity before undergoing an eyewall replacement cycle and started to weaken.

=== Super Typhoon Ruth ===
- Typhoon (JMA)
- Category 5 super typhoon (SSHWS)
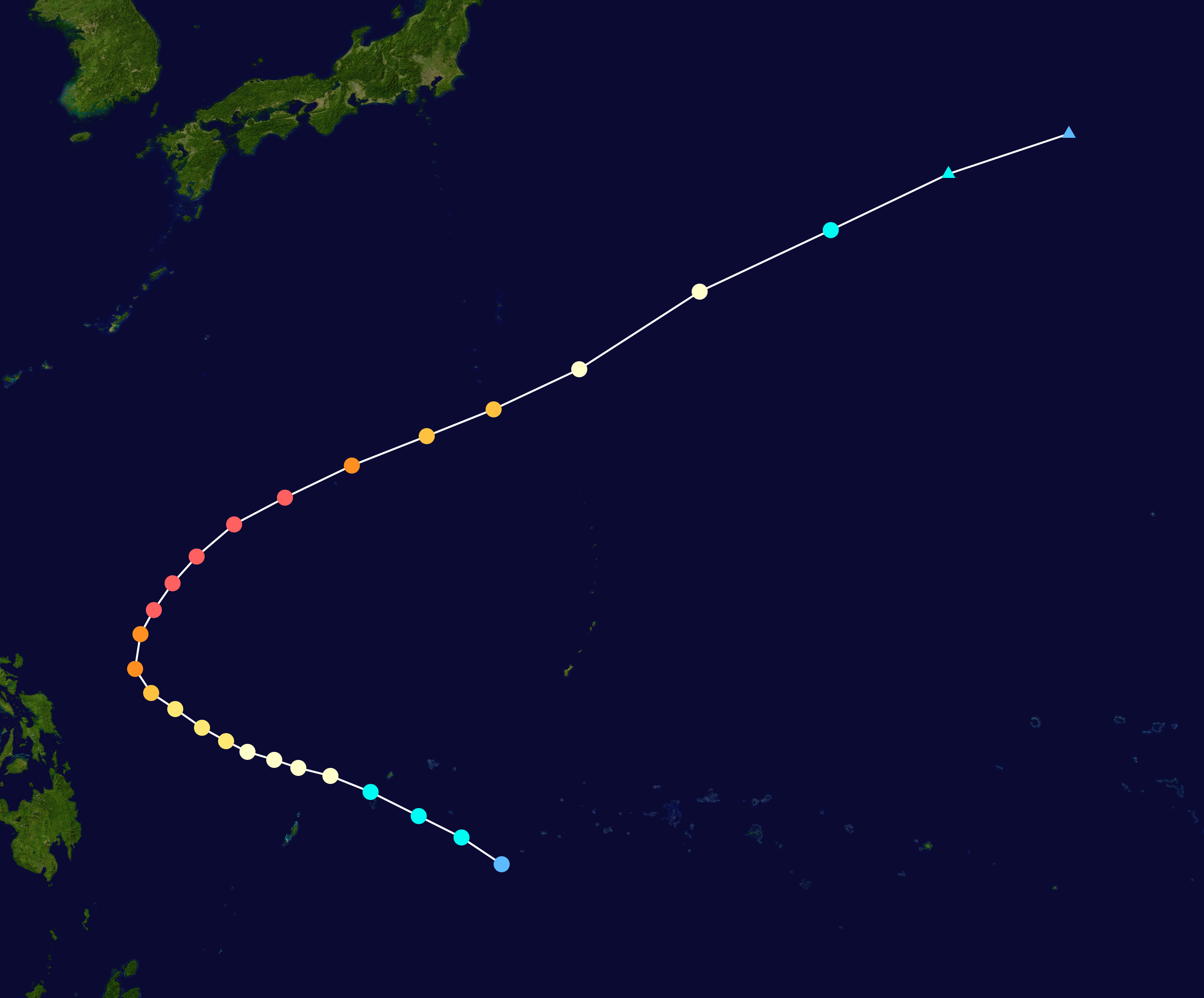
- Duration: December 12 – December 18
- Peak intensity: 335 km/h (205 mph) (1-min); 888 hPa (mbar)

Typhoon Ruth was one of the strongest storms on record reaching 180 kts (205 mph) sustained winds measured by a reconnaissance aircraft. However, it was later determined that measurements and estimates from the 1940s to 1960s were erroneous. Thus, Ruth's measurement may likely be lower than the official best-track values.

== Storm names ==
The names came from a series of four rotating lists. Names were used one after the other without regard to year, and when the bottom of one list was reached, the next named storm received the name at the top of the next list. The names Violet, Wilda, Dot, and Patsy were used for the first time this season.

- Violet
- Wilda
- Anita
- Billie
- Clara
- Dot
- Ellen
- Fran
- Georgia
- Hope
- Iris
- Joan
- Kate
- Louise
- Marge
- Nora
- Opal
- Patsy
- Ruth

== See also ==
- 1955 Pacific hurricane season
- 1955 Atlantic hurricane season
- 1955 North Indian Ocean cyclone season
- Australian region cyclone seasons: 1954–55 1955–56
- South Pacific cyclone seasons: 1954–55 1955–56
- South-West Indian Ocean cyclone seasons: 1954–55 1955–56
