= 1955 Flood =

Various floods occurred in 1955:

- 1955 Hunter Valley floods in New South Wales, Australia
- 1955 Connecticut floods in the United States
- Floods caused by cyclones in the:
  - 1955 Atlantic hurricane season (eastern Americas)
  - 1955 Pacific hurricane season (western American)
  - 1955 Pacific typhoon season (eastern Asia)
  - 1950s South Pacific cyclone seasons
  - 1950s Australian region cyclone seasons
