= List of storms named Hilda =

The name Hilda has been used for 14 tropical cyclones worldwide. Two occurred in the Atlantic Ocean, eight in the East Pacific Ocean, one in the West Pacific Ocean, one in the South-West Indian Ocean, and two in the Australian region.

In the Atlantic:

- Hurricane Hilda (1955) – a Category 3 hurricane that caused 304 fatalities across Cuba and Mexico
- Hurricane Hilda (1964) – a Category 4 hurricane that made landfall in Louisiana, becoming the costliest tropical cyclone for the state's offshore oil production at the time

The name Hilda was retired after the 1964 season, being replaced by Hannah.

In the East Pacific:

- Tropical Storm Hilda (1979) – did not affect land
- Tropical Storm Hilda (1985) – did not affect land
- Tropical Storm Hilda (1991) – caused rainfall as far north as San Francisco
- Tropical Storm Hilda (1997) – did not affect land
- Tropical Storm Hilda (2003) – did not affect land
- Tropical Storm Hilda (2009) – did not affect land
- Hurricane Hilda (2015) – a Category 4 hurricane that affected Hawaii
- Hurricane Hilda (2021) – a Category 1 hurricane that did not affect land

In the West Pacific:

- Tropical Storm Hilda (1999) (01W, Auring) – caused flooding and landslides in Sabah

In the South-West Indian:

- Tropical Storm Hilda (1963) – a moderate tropical storm

In the Australian region:

- Cyclone Hilda (1990) – a Category 2 tropical cyclone that had the coldest cloud-top temperature on record until Typhoon Kammuri in 2019
- Cyclone Hilda (2017) – a Category 2 tropical cyclone that made landfall near the Bidyadanga Community
