= Hurricane Ione =

Category 4 Atlantic hurricane in 1955

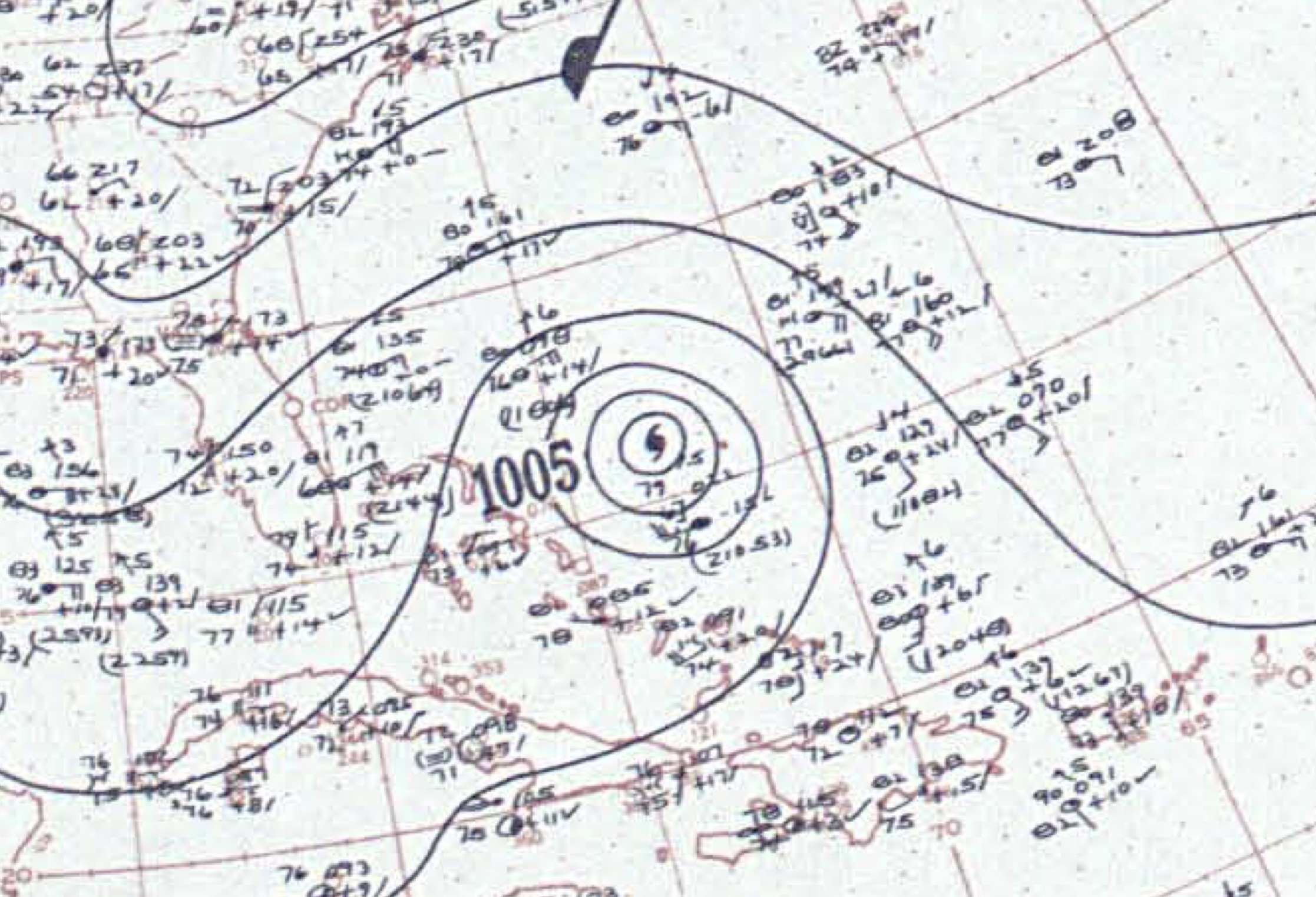
- Weather map of Hurricane Ione near peak intensity on September 17

Meteorological history
- Formed: September 10, 1955
- Dissipated: September 21, 1955

Category 4 major hurricane
- 1-minute sustained (SSHWS/NWS)
- Highest winds: 140 mph (220 km/h)
- Lowest pressure: 938 mbar (hPa); 27.70 inHg

Overall effects
- Fatalities: 7 direct
- Damage: $88 million (1955 USD)
- Areas affected: Leeward Islands, North Carolina, Virginia, Newfoundland
- IBTrACS
- Part of the 1955 Atlantic hurricane season

Hurricane Ione (/aɪˈoʊn/) was a strong Category 4 hurricane that affected the U.S. state of North Carolina in September 1955, bringing high winds and significant rainfall. It came on the heels of Hurricanes Connie and Diane, and compounded problems already caused by the two earlier hurricanes. Spawned by a tropical wave which left the African coast on September 6, the system became a tropical depression in the tropical North Atlantic, before turning northwest and developing into a hurricane. After turning back to the west east of the Bahamas, Ione turned northwest and northward, moving across eastern North Carolina before moving east-northeastward out to sea. Ione caused $600 million (2005 USD) in damage, much of it to crops across North Carolina. As a result of Ione's impacts seven people died.

== Meteorological history ==
Map plotting the storm's track and intensity, according to the Saffir–Simpson scale Map key Saffir–Simpson scale Tropical depression (≤38 mph, ≤62 km/h) Tropical storm (39–73 mph, 63–118 km/h) Category 1 (74–95 mph, 119–153 km/h) Category 2 (96–110 mph, 154–177 km/h) Category 3 (111–129 mph, 178–208 km/h) Category 4 (130–156 mph, 209–251 km/h) Category 5 (≥157 mph, ≥252 km/h) Unknown Storm type Tropical cyclone Subtropical cyclone Extratropical cyclone, remnant low, tropical disturbance, or monsoon depression

A tropical wave moved through Cape Verde on September 6. On September 11, Ione developed into a tropical depression. Ione remained weak for the next few days, and then began to steadily intensify as it moved north of the Lesser Antilles, reaching hurricane strength on September 15. Conditions were favorable for additional development, and Ione peaked with winds of 140 miles per hour (230 km/h) on September 18 while north of the Bahamas.

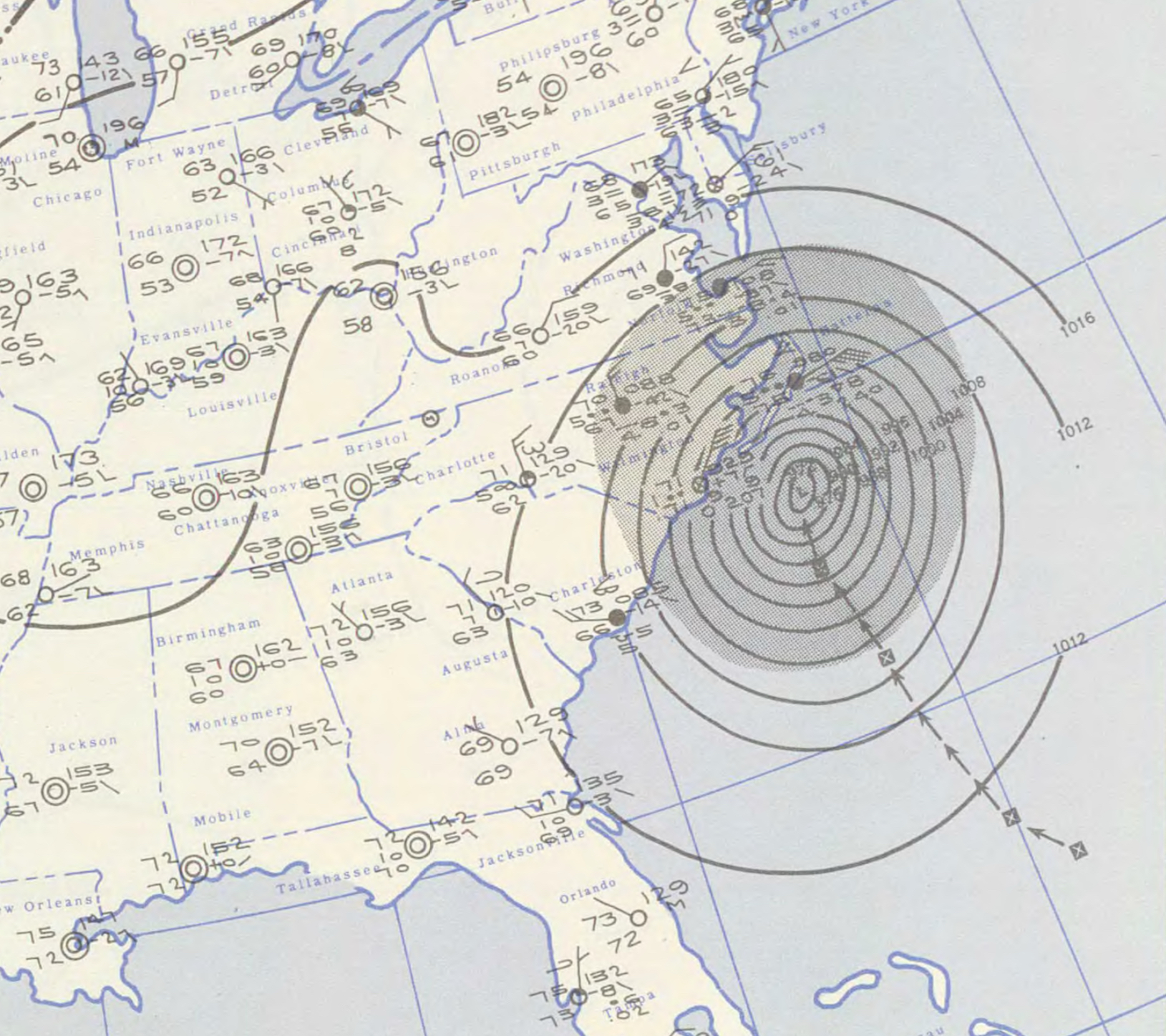
Surface weather analysis showing Hurricane Ione approaching North Carolina on September 19

Drier and cooler air gradually became entrained in Ione's circulation, and the storm weakened into a Category 2 hurricane at the time of its Wilmington, North Carolina, landfall on September 19, which made Ione the third hurricane to hit the state in six weeks and fourth in 11 months. Ione was the first tropical cyclone to be observed on the Cape Hatteras radar during landfall and was one of the first observed to make small-scale oscillations within its track. The storm weakened to a tropical storm over land but restrengthened to a Category 2 hurricane over the northwestern Atlantic. Ione continued northeastward and became an extratropical cyclone on September 21. The extratropical storm crossed over Newfoundland and was last seen on September 24 moving across the North Atlantic.

== Preparations ==
Hurricane warnings were in effect from the Virginia Capes to Morehead, North Carolina and a Hurricane alert was issued northward to Atlantic City, New Jersey. Dump trucks loaded with dirt were ready to make earthen dikes around the Riegel paper mill, due to the severe damage caused to it by hurricanes earlier that year which caused the 1955 Delaware River flood. Recent flooding, from Hurricane Diane, along the Delaware River kept residents along its banks alert should the storm strike, business owners were also ready to move their merchandise if the need arose. New York City officials prepared for the worst, with police officers filling gas tanks of their patrol cars and extra patrol men being called to duty in advance of the hurricane. Flights were canceled in New York, firemen stood at the ready in Staten Island, and the Coast Guard warned shipping companies of the impending storm. A boxing match between Rocky Marciano and Archie Moore was delayed, which allowed the promoters to sell an additional $150,000 (1955) in tickets, which is $1.8 million in present-day figures.

When one of the first tropical cyclone forecast models was developed, Ione was chosen as one of the candidates to test out its reliability. The errors associated with Ione were significant, as the model did not forecast Ione to make landfall in North Carolina, forcing the storm eastward to the south of the state.

== Impact ==
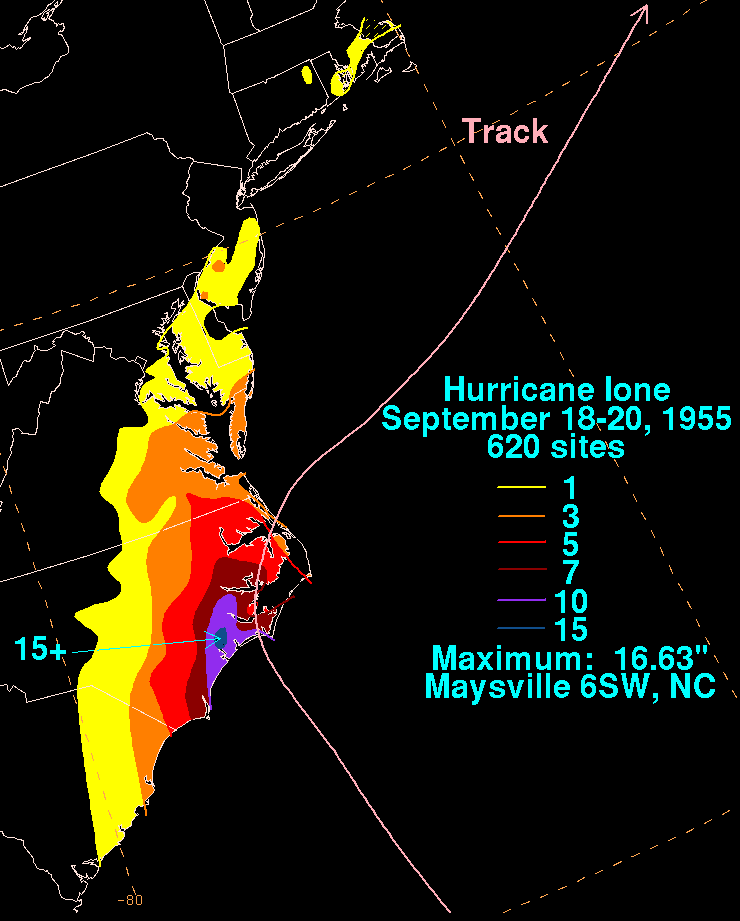
United States rainfall from Ione

September 18 was a gloomy day in Swan Quarter, North Carolina and winds did not significantly increase until between 2 and 3 p.m. By 9:30 p.m., strong winds buffeted the area from the east-northeast and the electricity went out at around 10:50 p.m. Area homes flooded for the first time since Barbara of the 1953 Atlantic hurricane season and the tides increased until 8:45 a.m. on September 19 before rapidly rising between 2:00 and 2:30 p.m. The Lake Causeway was partially washed out towards New Holland. The Diamond Shoals lightship was reported to have broken loose during the hurricane. Tides did not fully recede at Swan Quarter until 3 a.m. on September 20, with winds finally dying down after 7 a.m. the same day. Cherry Point recorded a maximum sustained wind of 75 miles per hour (121 km/h), with gusts to 107 miles per hour (172 km/h). Prolonged easterly winds forced the tide to increase to levels 3 feet (0.91 m) to 10 feet (3.0 m) above normal, which resulted in one of the largest inundations in North Carolina history. The storm surge from Ione was recorded at 3.6 feet (1.1 m) at Morehead City, North Carolina, while a storm tide of 5.3 feet (1.6 m) was measured at Wrightsville Beach, North Carolina. It was reported that the storm lasted for nearly two days in North Carolina. HMTS Monarch, which had departed from Newfoundland, was laying telephone cable across the Atlantic ocean when Ione crossed its path. The ship weathered the storm, and managed to reach Scotland to complete its mission by September 26.

Ione caused $600 million (2005 USD) in damage, much of it to crops across North Carolina. The rest came from flooding in an area already devastated by Hurricanes Connie and Diane six weeks earlier. Along the Trent River near Trent and the New River near Gum Branch, North Carolina, the river stage reached heights not seen again until Hurricane Floyd of the 1999 Atlantic hurricane season. Ione caused seven deaths in North Carolina, a low number attributed to well-executed warnings and effectiveness of relief groups such as the Red Cross.

Ione made landfall in Newfoundland, Canada during the evening of September 21 as a tropical storm and as a result cause wind and rain damage. That day the storm became extratropical, yet still had negative effects on Canada. In Carbonear a boy broke his leg after being blown into a car and thousands of dollars in damage, as well as broken poles, uprooted trees, interrupted telephone service, damaged chimneys and power outages were reported in St. John's, Canada. There were also reports of roof damage and a trailer being torn for its foundation. Three flights were cancelled, schools were closed and the ferry service between Bell Island and Portugal Cove was disrupted. On September 23 there were reports of boats that had been lost and in Harbour Grace and Harbour Main. There was also a report of a garage being flipped with a car still in it. There were also reports of a street and two mines being flooded in Corner Brook and it was reported that there was $2 million damage to the province. There was extensive damage to waterfront property on the southern coast of Newfoundland. On September 24 there were reports of fishermen losing gear, a house being blown off its foundation in Foxtrap, damage to the phone company, a washed out road in Swift Current and damage to the power company. On September 27 it was reported that buoys were destroyed in Harbour Grace, Fortune and Stag Harbour. There was also damage done to a freighter in Conception Bay.

== Retirement ==
Due to the damage it caused, the name Ione was retired by the U.S. Weather Bureau after the 1955 season. The name will never again be used for a North Atlantic basin tropical cyclone.

== See also ==
- Hurricane Bonnie (1998)
- List of Atlantic hurricanes
- List of wettest tropical cyclones in North Carolina
- List of North Carolina hurricanes
