= Hurricane Hilda (1955) =

Category 3 Atlantic hurricane in 1955

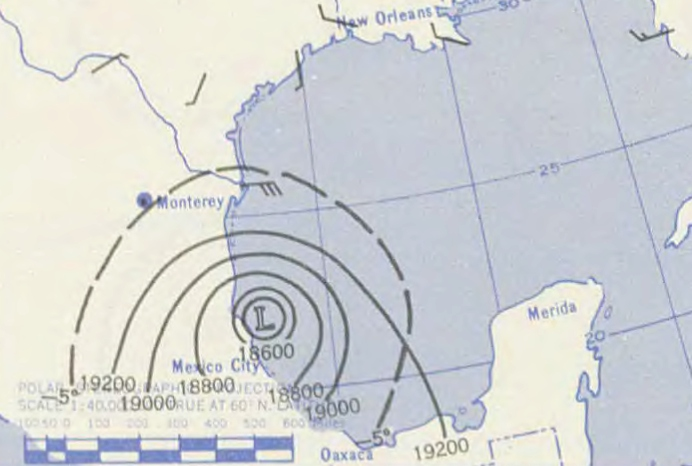
- Mid-level geopotential height map of Hilda making landfall

Meteorological history
- Formed: September 10, 1955
- Dissipated: September 20, 1955

Category 3 major hurricane
- 1-minute sustained (SSHWS/NWS)
- Highest winds: 120 mph (195 km/h)
- Lowest pressure: 952 mbar (hPa); 28.11 inHg

Overall effects
- Fatalities: 304 direct
- Damage: $120 million (1955 USD)
- Areas affected: Hispaniola, Cuba, Cayman Islands, Yucatán Peninsula, Mainland Mexico
- IBTrACS
- Part of the 1955 Atlantic hurricane season

Hurricane Hilda was a strong Category 3 hurricane that was the second in a succession of three hurricanes to strike near Tampico, Mexico. The eighth named storm of the 1955 Atlantic hurricane season, Hilda formed from a tropical wave on September 10 near the Lesser Antilles. It quickly intensified while moving westward into a small hurricane, and it crossed over southeastern Cuba on September 13. There, it dropped heavy rainfall and produced gusty winds that destroyed 80% of the coffee crop in Oriente Province. In the eastern Cuban city of Baracoa, Hilda severely damaged the oldest church in the country. Damage totaled $2 million in Cuba, and there were four deaths. Later, the hurricane moved across the Northwestern Caribbean Sea making landfall in Grand Cayman, then further into the Northwestern Caribbean causing light damage in the sparsely populated region of the eastern Yucatán Peninsula.

After reaching the Gulf of Mexico, Hilda strengthened to reach peak winds of 120 mph (200 km/h) late on September 18. Before the hurricane moved ashore, there was residual flooding in Tampico from earlier Hurricane Gladys. Hilda struck the city early on September 19, with gusts estimated at 150 mph (240 km/h). It dropped heavy rainfall that flooded 90% of Tampico, while its strong winds damaged half of the homes, leaving 15,000 homeless. The storm killed 300 people and caused over $120 million (1955 USD) in Mexico. Ongoing flooding caused an outbreak of dysentery, and about 10 days after Hilda struck, Hurricane Janet struck the same region and caused further flooding and damage. Collectively, the damage from the storms represented about half of Mexico's budget in 1955. Despite the high death toll of 304 and damages of $120 million, the name Hilda was not retired after the season.

== Meteorological history ==
Map plotting the storm's track and intensity, according to the Saffir–Simpson scale Map key Saffir–Simpson scale Tropical depression (≤38 mph, ≤62 km/h) Tropical storm (39–73 mph, 63–118 km/h) Category 1 (74–95 mph, 119–153 km/h) Category 2 (96–110 mph, 154–177 km/h) Category 3 (111–129 mph, 178–208 km/h) Category 4 (130–156 mph, 209–251 km/h) Category 5 (≥157 mph, ≥252 km/h) Unknown Storm type Tropical cyclone Subtropical cyclone Extratropical cyclone, remnant low, tropical disturbance, or monsoon depression

The origins of Hurricane Hilda were from an easterly wave, which spawned a tropical depression over the northern Lesser Antilles late on September 10. By the next day, the system was producing winds of 46 mph (74 km/h) in squalls. After moving to the northwest, it turned more to the west and quickly intensified. On September 12, Hilda attained hurricane status to the north of the Mona Passage between Puerto Rico and the Dominican Republic. It was a small cyclone, and the strongest winds were in a small region around the eye. Hilda continued to the west about 30 mi (48 km) offshore northern Hispaniola. After reaching winds of 100 mph (160 km/h), the hurricane weakened slightly while off the north coast of Haiti. Turning to the west-southwest, Hilda made landfall near the southeastern tip of Cuba on September 13. While crossing the island into the Caribbean Sea, it weakened from a hurricane into a tropical storm.

On September 14, Hilda emerged into the Caribbean Sea. It quickly re-intensified, surpassing its previous strength to winds of 115 mph (185 km/h) by September 15. Hilda made Landfall on Grand Cayman, Cayman Islands. The hurricane weakened slightly as it neared the Yucatán Peninsula, and Hilda struck the sparsely populated area between Chetumal and Cozumel on September 16 with winds of about 110 mph (180 km/h). It weakened slightly over the Yucatán Peninsula, emerging into the Gulf of Mexico on September 17 with winds of about 100 mph (160 km/h). Hilda again re-intensified, reaching its maximum sustained winds of 125 mph (205 km/h) late on September 18. Early the next day, the hurricane made landfall near Tampico, Tamaulipas in northeastern Mexico. Winds in the city reached 105 mph (169 km/h), and the eye was observed for 45 minutes. The lowest pressure in Tampico was 952 mbar (28.1 inHg) on September 19. Hilda rapidly weakened over land, turning to the west-southwest and dissipating on September 20.

== Impact ==
Early in its duration, the storm produced winds of 55 mph (89 km/h) on Grand Turk Island. Its threat prompted a small craft advisory for southern Florida, the southern Bahamas, and Cuba.

When Hilda struck southeastern Cuba, it caused moderate damage and killed four people, all of whom in Oriente Province. Wind gusts reached 45 mph (72 km/h) at Guantanamo Bay Naval Base, which caused a brief power outage. High waves washed a freighter ashore along Cuba's north coast. Strong winds severely damaged the church in Baracoa, which was built in the 16th century and was the oldest in the country. In Santiago de Cuba, Hilda produced heavy rains and gusty winds, which knocked down telephone lines and caused flooding. Five people were injured after houses collapsed in the city. High rains and winds damaged the sugar cane and pineapple crop, and destroyed 80% of the coffee crop in Oriente Province. Damage in the country was not severe, estimated at $2 million. Hundreds of people were injured or left homeless. After the hurricane isolated the town of Caimanera, American workers sent a train there from Guantanamo Bay with a medical team and supplies.

While Hilda moved across the western Caribbean, it produced winds of 55 mph (89 km/h) on Grand Cayman Island, as it made Landfall on the island.

Ahead of Hilda's landfall on the Yucatán peninsula, officials warned the residents to prepare for high winds and waves. A storm warning was issued in Belize City. When Hilda crossed the Yucatán peninsula, it caused about $100,000 in damage.

Ahead of the storm in South Texas, officials provided sandbags and advised businesses to move merchandise within 2 ft (0.61 m) of the floor, both an effort to mitigate potential flooding. The large circulation produced winds of 22 mph (35 km/h) and flooded coastal roads in southern Texas. Outer rainbands flooded Raymondville and other towns in the region.

Before the hurricane struck, residents in Mexico expected that Hurricane Hilda would be weaker and strike near Tampico. When the storm was announced via radio about three hours before landfall, most people were already asleep and unable to prepare. Tides rose in advance of the storm, and before it made landfall, 10% of Tampico was still flooded from previous Hurricane Gladys. In Tampico, Hilda's strong winds blew away an anemometer after the instrument recorded winds of 105 mph (169 km/h); peak winds were later estimated at 150 mph (240 km/h). At the city's port, Hilda damaged boats and ferries, some of which washed out to sea. The hurricane destroyed the roofs of about half of the city's houses, as well as several schools and large buildings. Hilda produced severe flooding in Tampico that was reported to have covered 90% of the city's streets. Although smaller than the previous Hurricane Gladys, Hilda dropped heavy rainfall that flooded local rivers. Overall, 11,432 people were directly affected by Hilda. The hurricane caused 300 deaths and $120 million in damage, mostly due to the flooding.

== Aftermath ==
After the storm, Tampico was left without power or communications. About 15,000 people became homeless due to the storm, or previously from Hurricane Gladys. The governor of Tamaulipas declared a state of emergency and requested assistance from the military to provide food and shelter. Within a day after the storm, water access was restored, although the city initially remained without power or telephone. Communications were cut to Tampico, except for the airport at the radio. The rail line from Laredo, Texas to Mexico City was cut during the storm, but was restored ten days later. Due to ongoing flood conditions, there was an outbreak of dysentery that killed two children. The Mexican government flew medical supplies, food, and clothing from Mexico City to Tampico, while four United States helicopters assisted in rescue missions along the Pánuco River. About 10 days after Hilda struck Tampico, Hurricane Janet affected the same area, causing further damage and deaths. Collectively, the two hurricanes caused 1,240 deaths along their paths, and damage from the consecutive storms totaled about half of Mexico's 1955 national budget. After the two hurricanes, the Mexican government and military worked to assist the affected residents, and the Mexican Red Cross provided vaccinations and medical assistance to prevent the spread of disease.

== See also ==
- Other storms of the same name
- 1933 Tampico hurricane - similarly damaging storm 23 years prior
- Hurricane Grace - another storm that took a similar track and became the strongest hurricane recorded to make landfall in the Bay of Campeche
