= 1955 Pacific hurricane season =

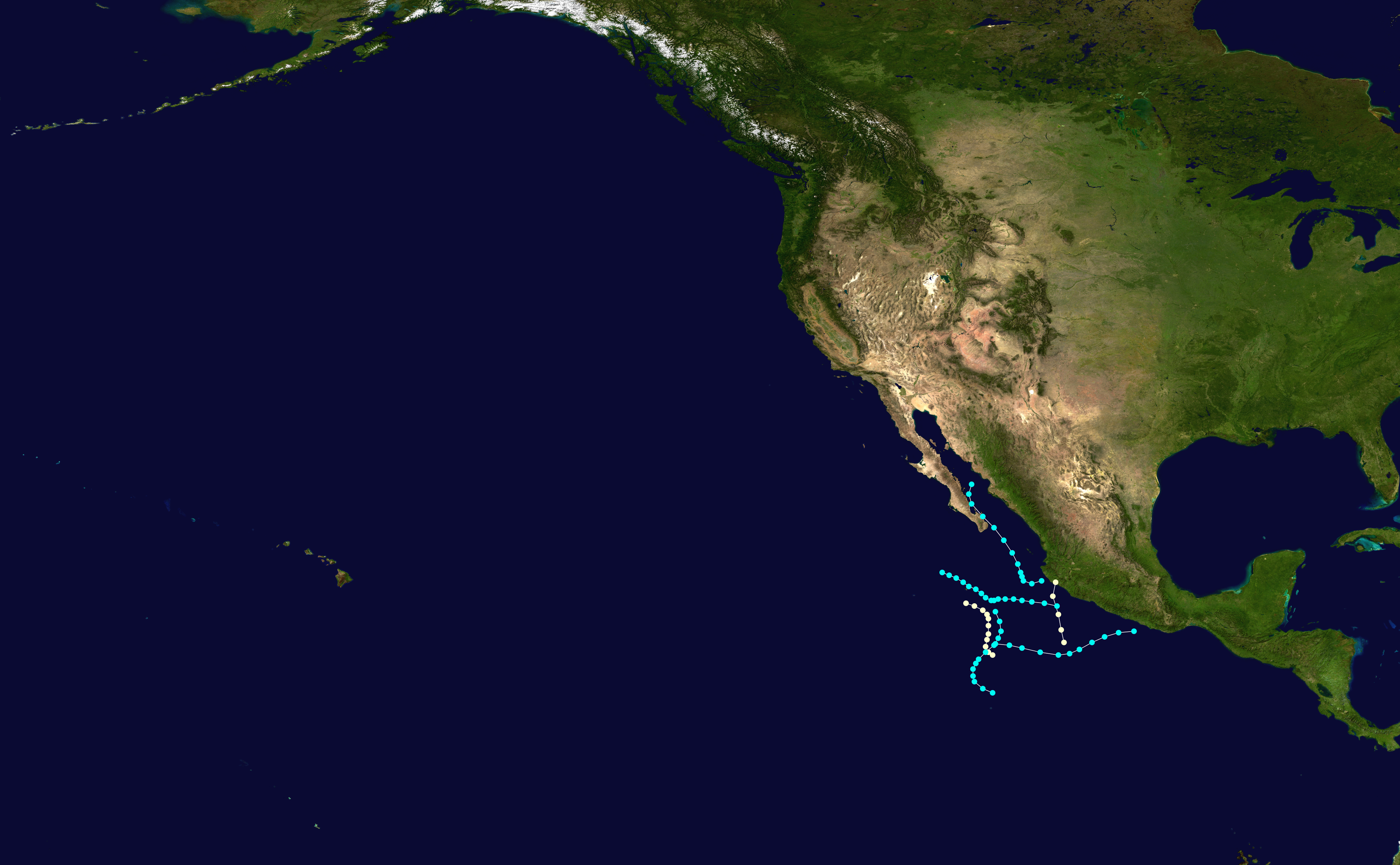
- Season summary map

Seasonal boundaries
- First system formed: June 6, 1955
- Last system dissipated: October 16, 1955

Strongest storm
- Name: One
  - Maximum winds: 85 mph (140 km/h) (1-minute sustained)

Seasonal statistics
- Total storms: 6
- Hurricanes: 2
- Major hurricanes (Cat. 3+): 0
- Total fatalities: 40
- Total damage: Unknown

Related articles
- 1955 Atlantic hurricane season; 1955 Pacific typhoon season; 1950s North Indian Ocean cyclone seasons

The 1955 Pacific hurricane seasons began on May 15, 1955, in the northeast Pacific Ocean and on June 1, 1955, in the central Pacific. They ended on November 30, 1955. These dates conventionally delimit the time of year when most tropical cyclones form in northeast Pacific Ocean.

Before the satellite age started in the 1960s, data on east Pacific hurricanes is extremely unreliable. Most east Pacific storms are of no threat to land. Six tropical systems were observed this season.

== Systems ==
=== Hurricane One ===
- Category 1 hurricane (SSHWS)
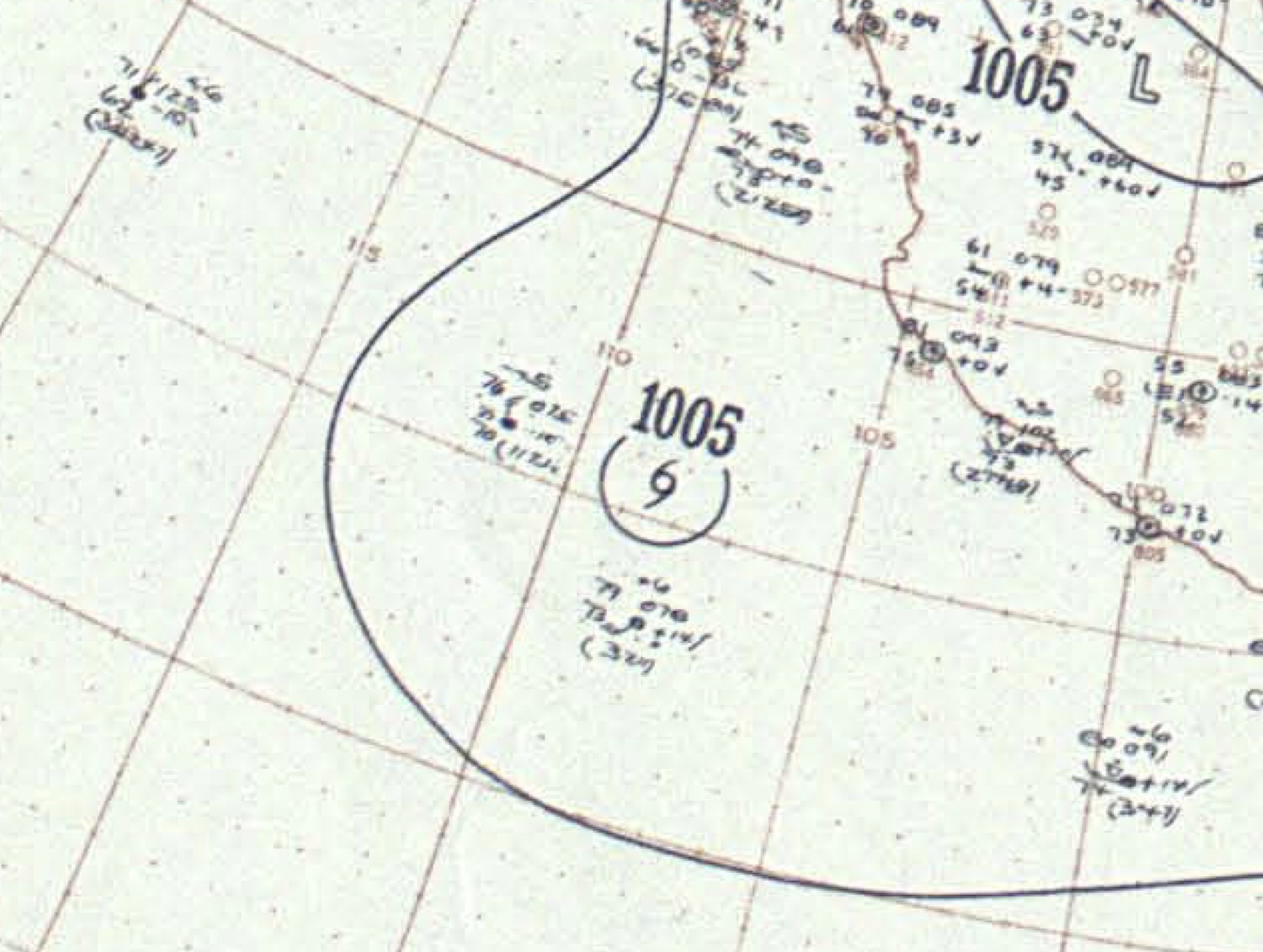
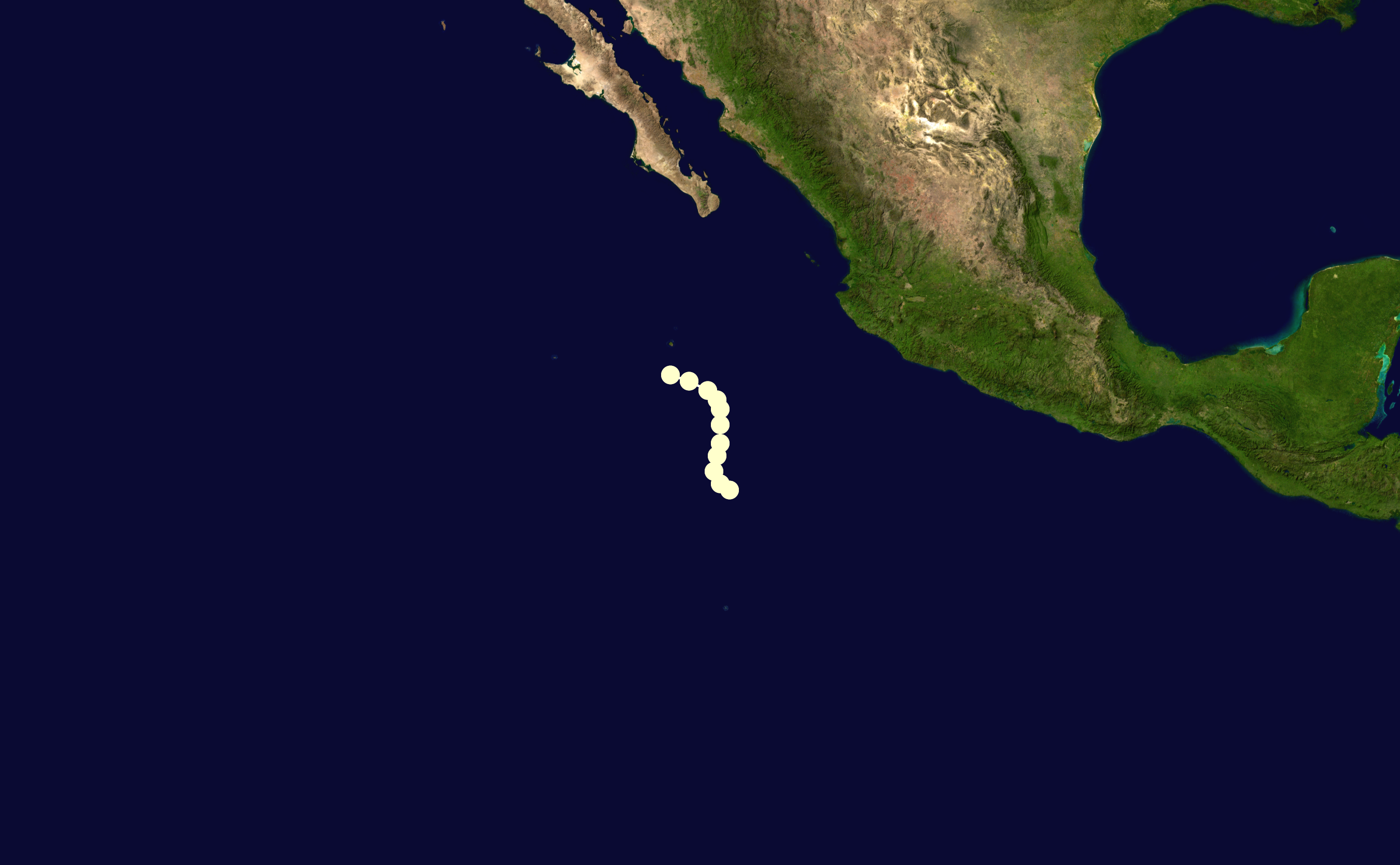
- Duration: June 6 – June 8
- Peak intensity: 85 mph (140 km/h) (1-min); 990 mbar (hPa)

Hurricane One existed from June 6 to June 8.

=== Tropical Storm Two ===
- Tropical storm (SSHWS)
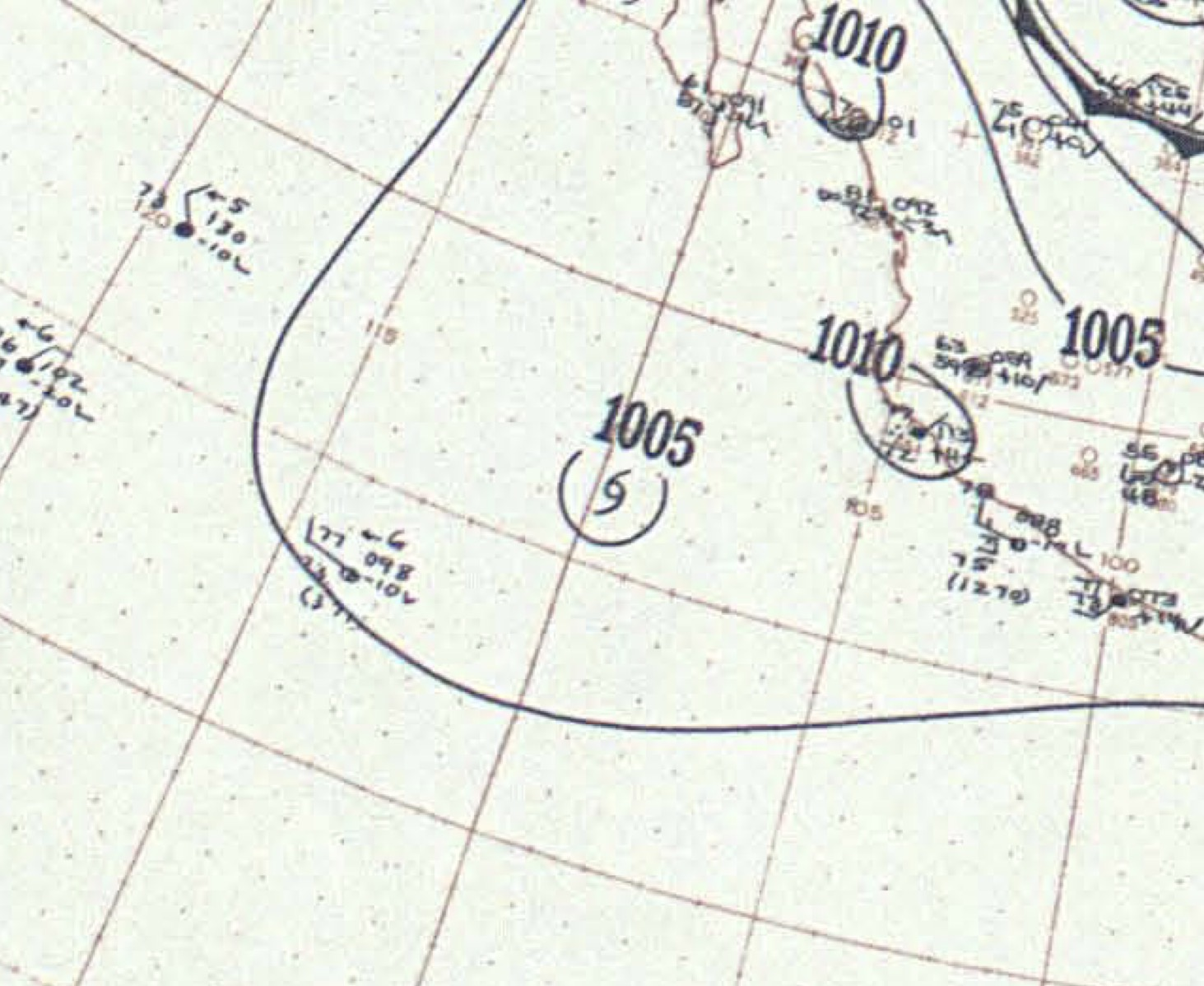
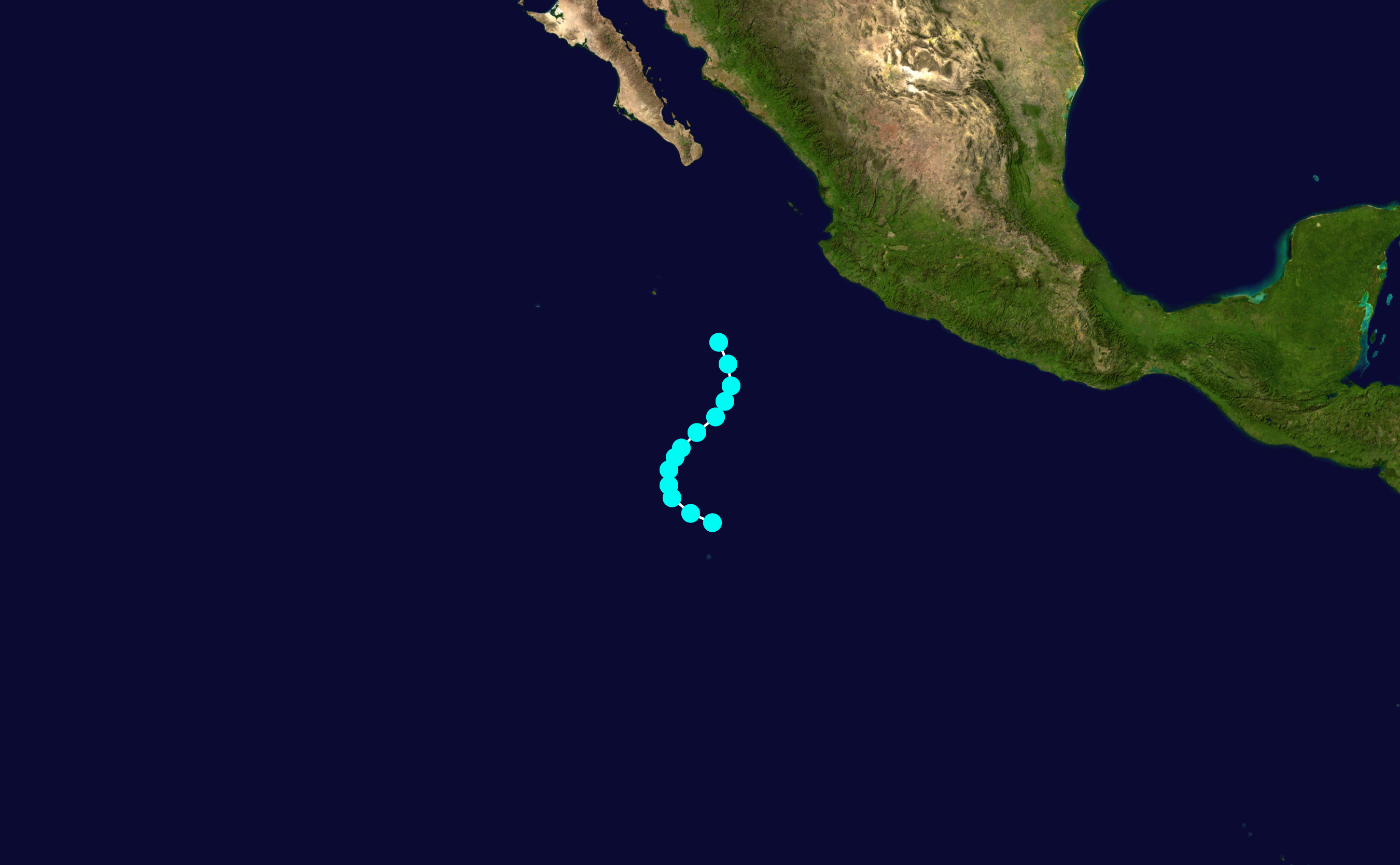
- Duration: June 8 – June 11
- Peak intensity: 50 mph (85 km/h) (1-min); 1003 mbar (hPa)

Tropical Storm Two existed from June 8 to June 11.

=== Tropical Storm Three ===
- Tropical storm (SSHWS)
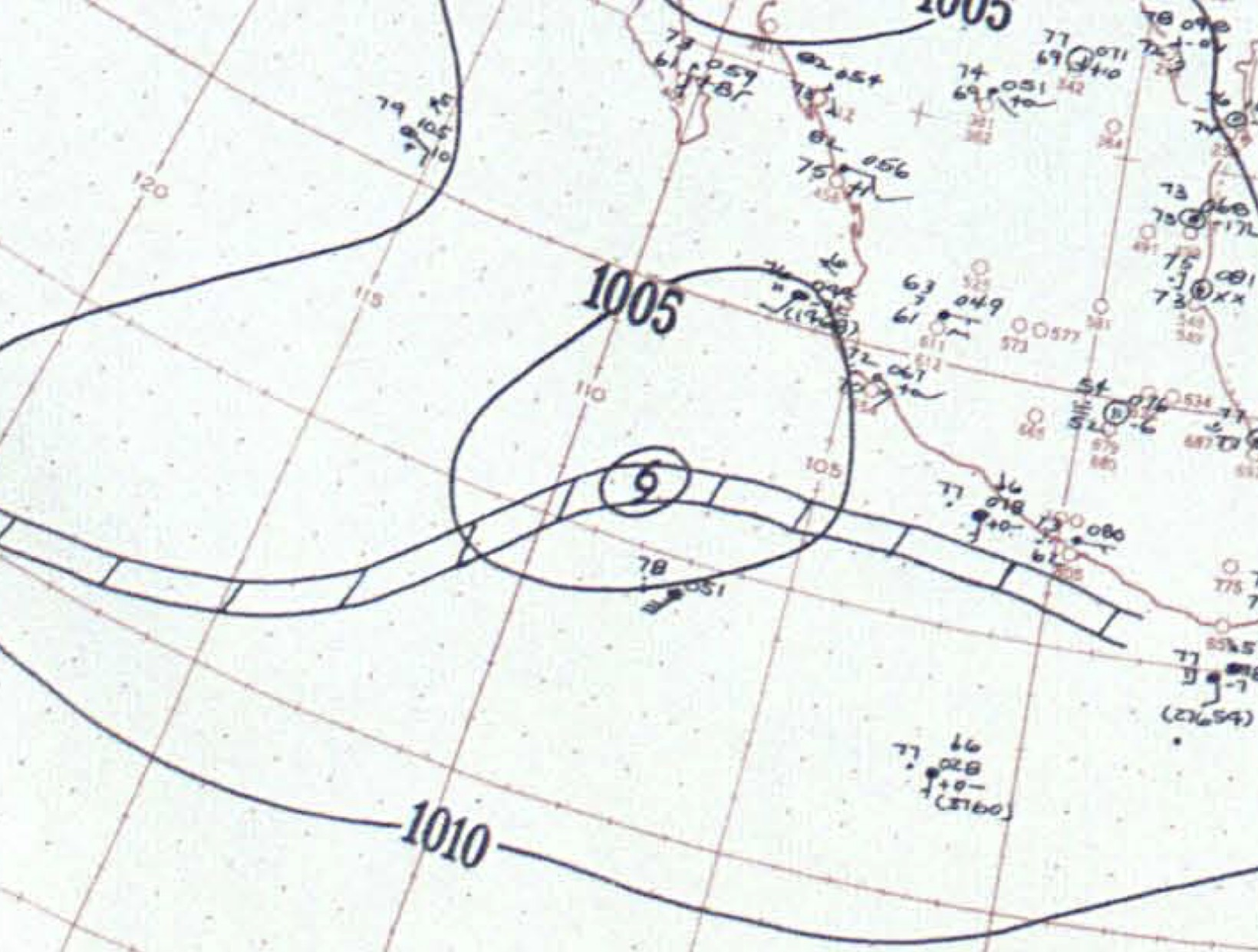
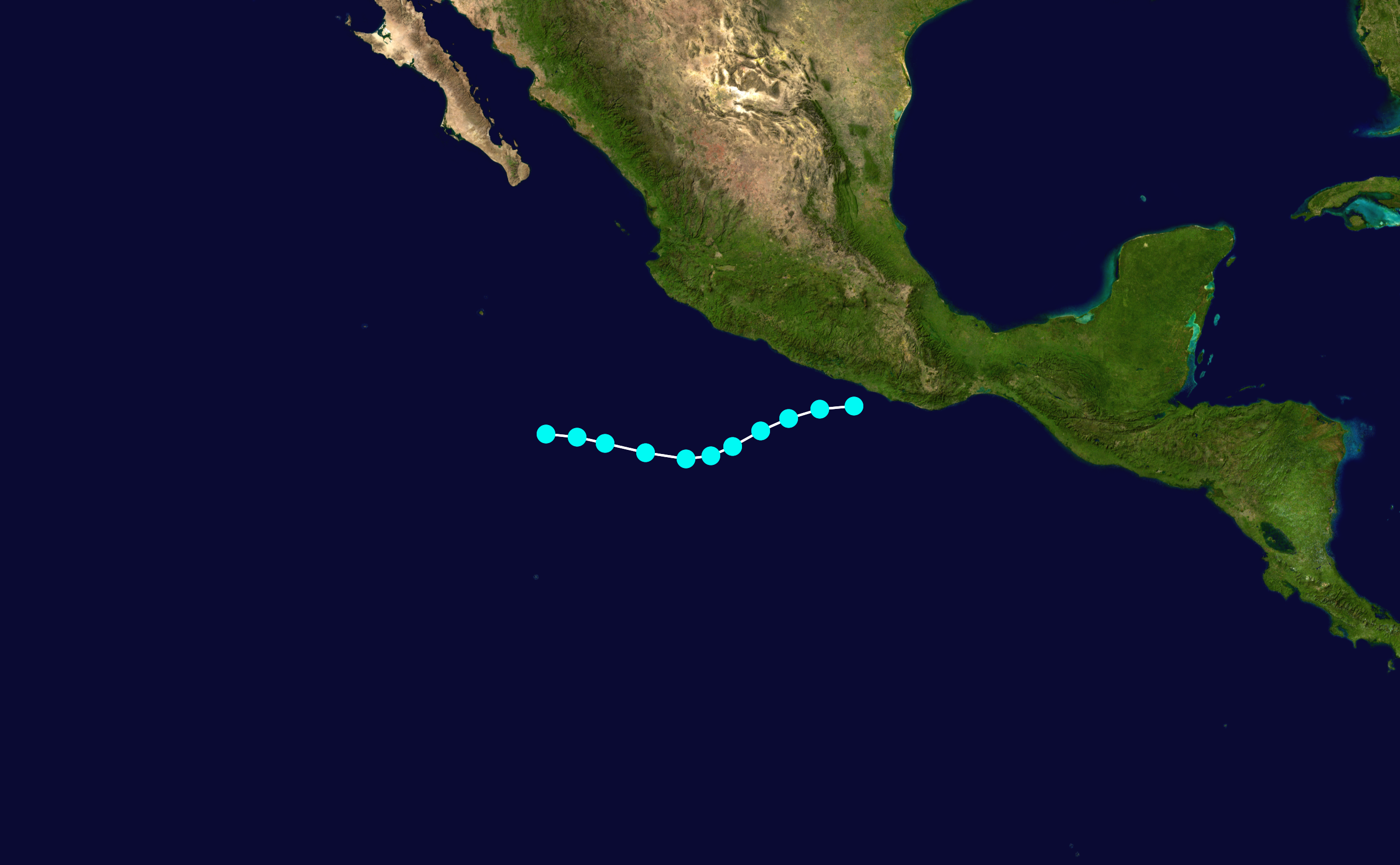
- Duration: July 6 – July 9
- Peak intensity: 50 mph (85 km/h) (1-min); 1005 mbar (hPa)

Tropical Storm Three existed from July 6 to July 9.

=== Tropical Storm Four ===
- Tropical storm (SSHWS)
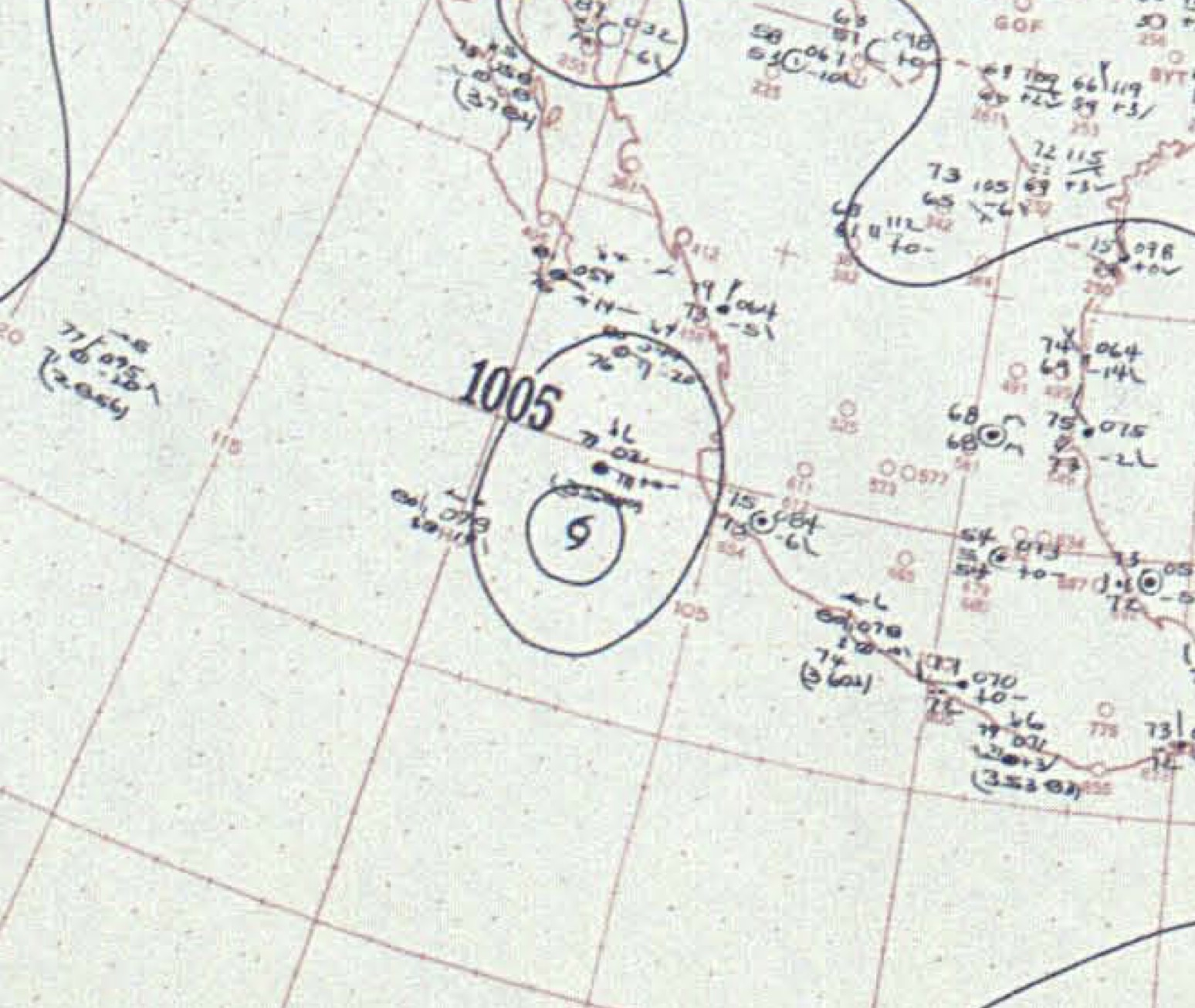
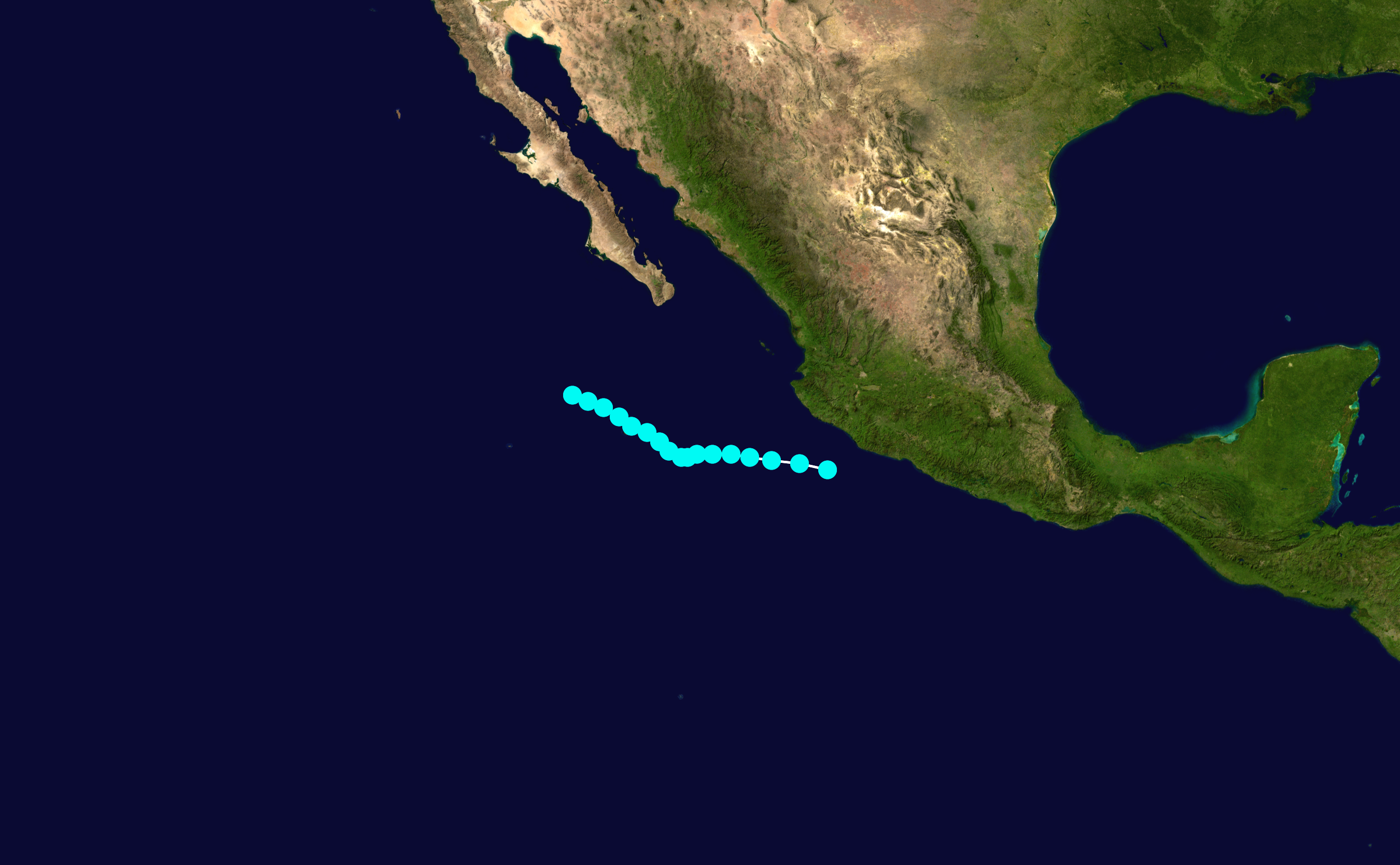
- Duration: September 1 – September 5
- Peak intensity: 50 mph (85 km/h) (1-min); 1000 mbar (hPa)

Tropical Storm Four developed on September 1 and moved away from Mexico while weakening. This stormed dissipated on September 5.

=== Tropical Storm Five ===
- Tropical storm (SSHWS)
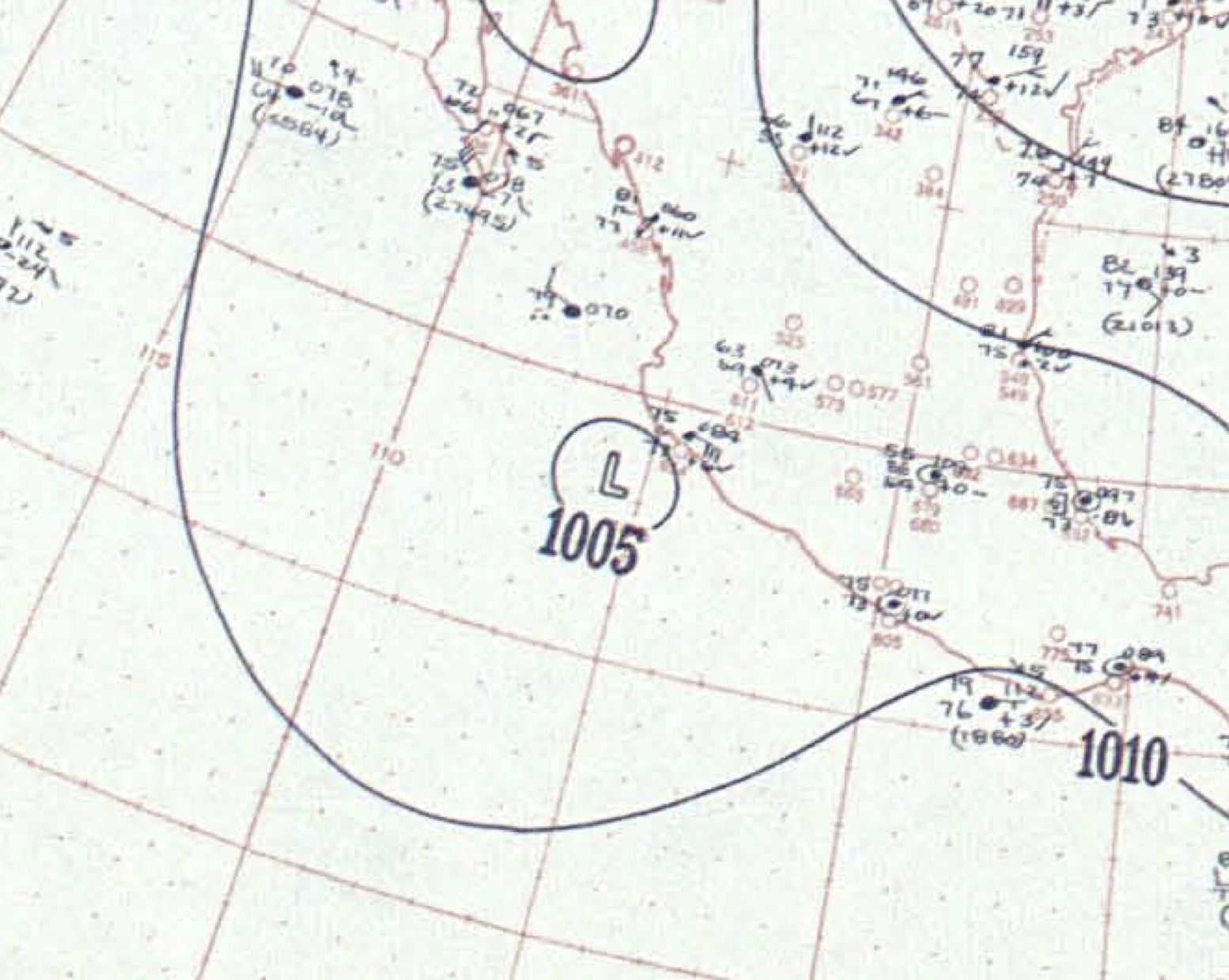
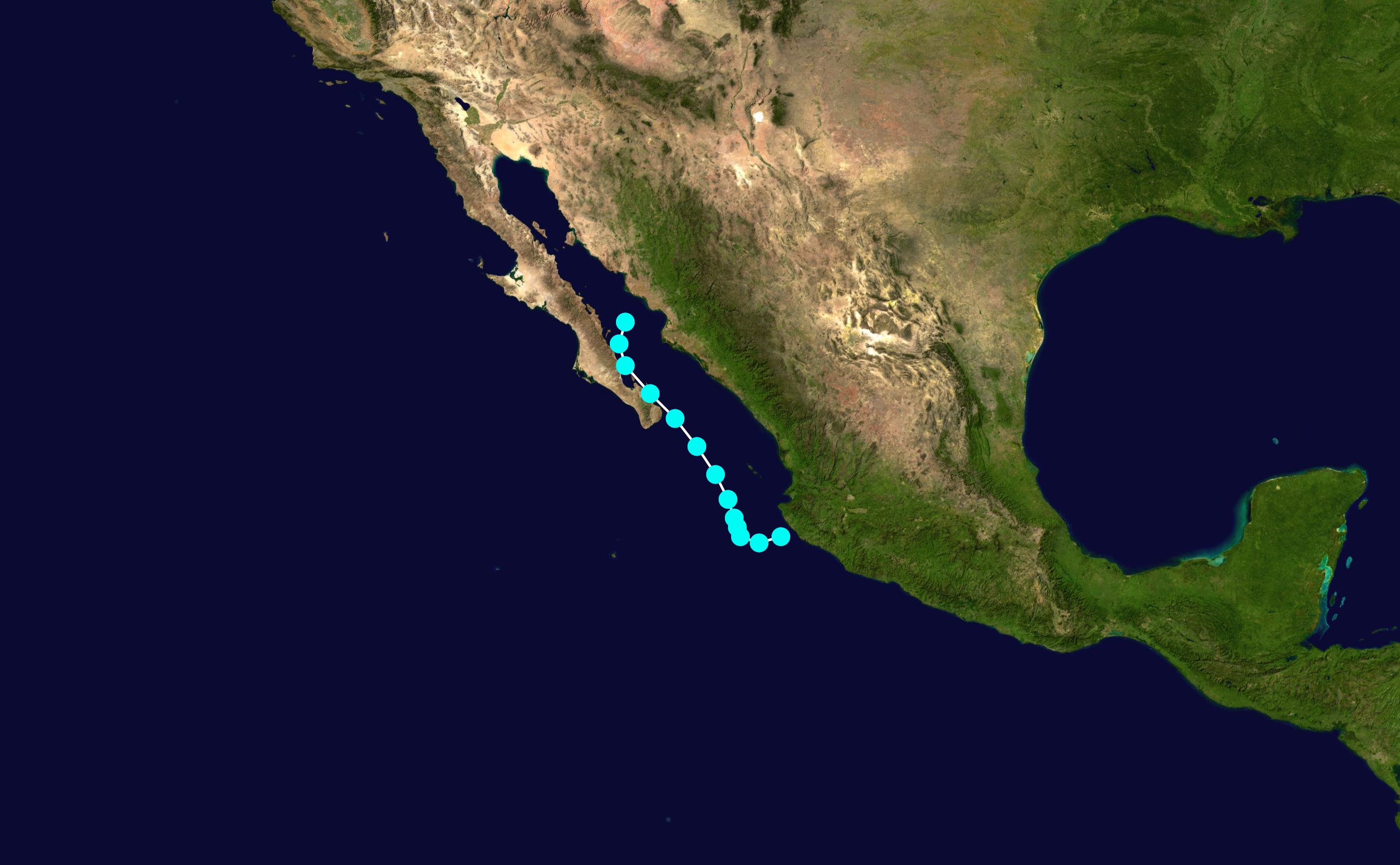
- Duration: October 1 – October 4
- Peak intensity: 50 mph (85 km/h) (1-min); 1002 mbar (hPa)

In early October, the remnants of Hurricane Janet entered the Pacific Ocean, which later re-organized into the fifth tropical storm of the Pacific hurricane season. On October 1, the storm began to curve northwestward due to a ridge over Texas. Over the following days, however, a shortwave over the United States West Coast forced to the storm to the north and then east. The tropical storm maintained the same intensity throughout its existence, before making landfall on Baja California Sur at 0600 UTC on October 3. The disturbance crossed back into the Gulf of California, where it dissipated the following day. The remnants of the cyclone later moved into Sonora. In the United States, rainfall was spread throughout areas of Arizona and New Mexico. Stations in Tatum and Lovington, New Mexico, recorded peak rainfall totals in excess of 3 in (76 mm).

=== Hurricane Six ===
- Category 1 hurricane (SSHWS)
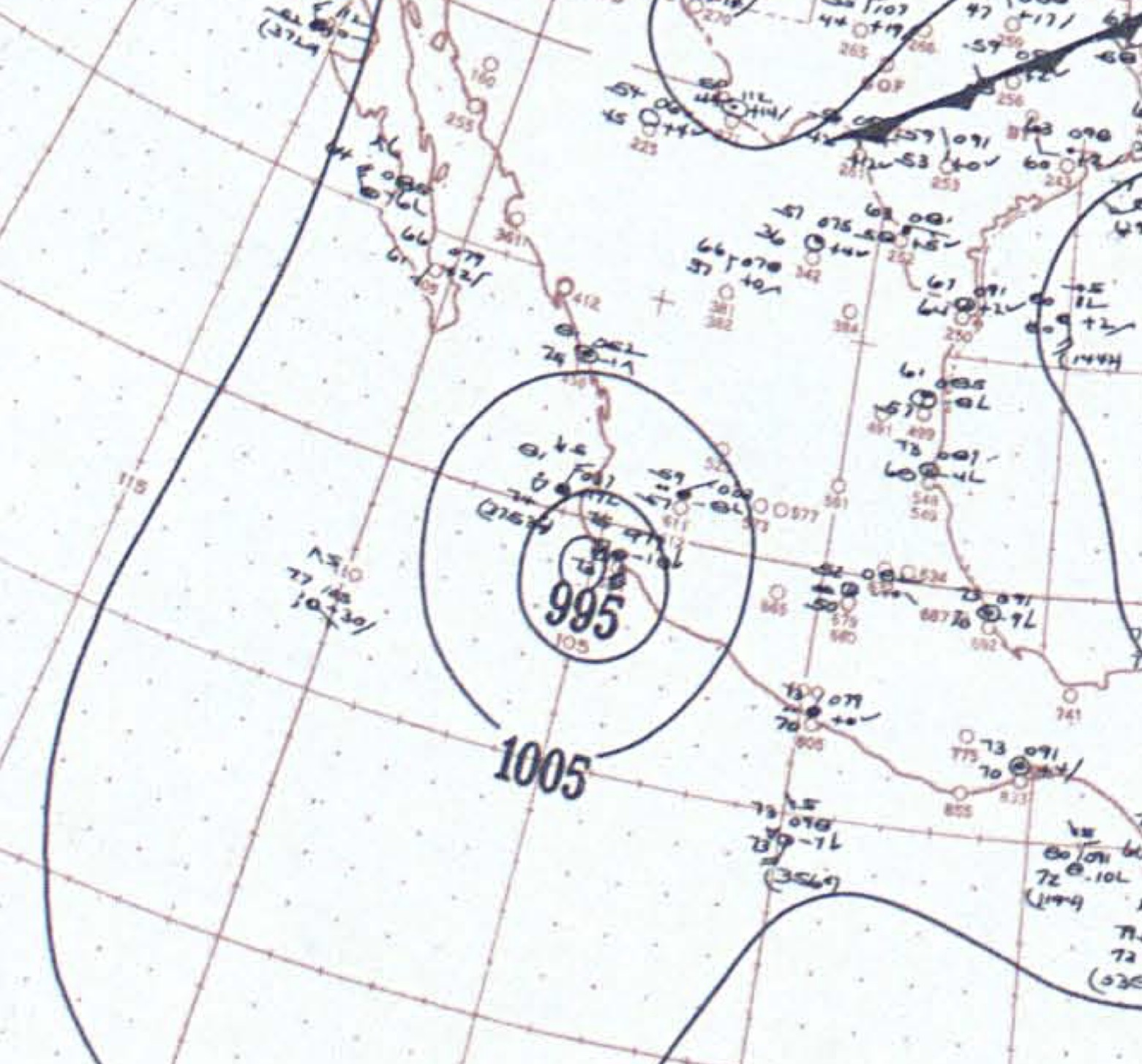
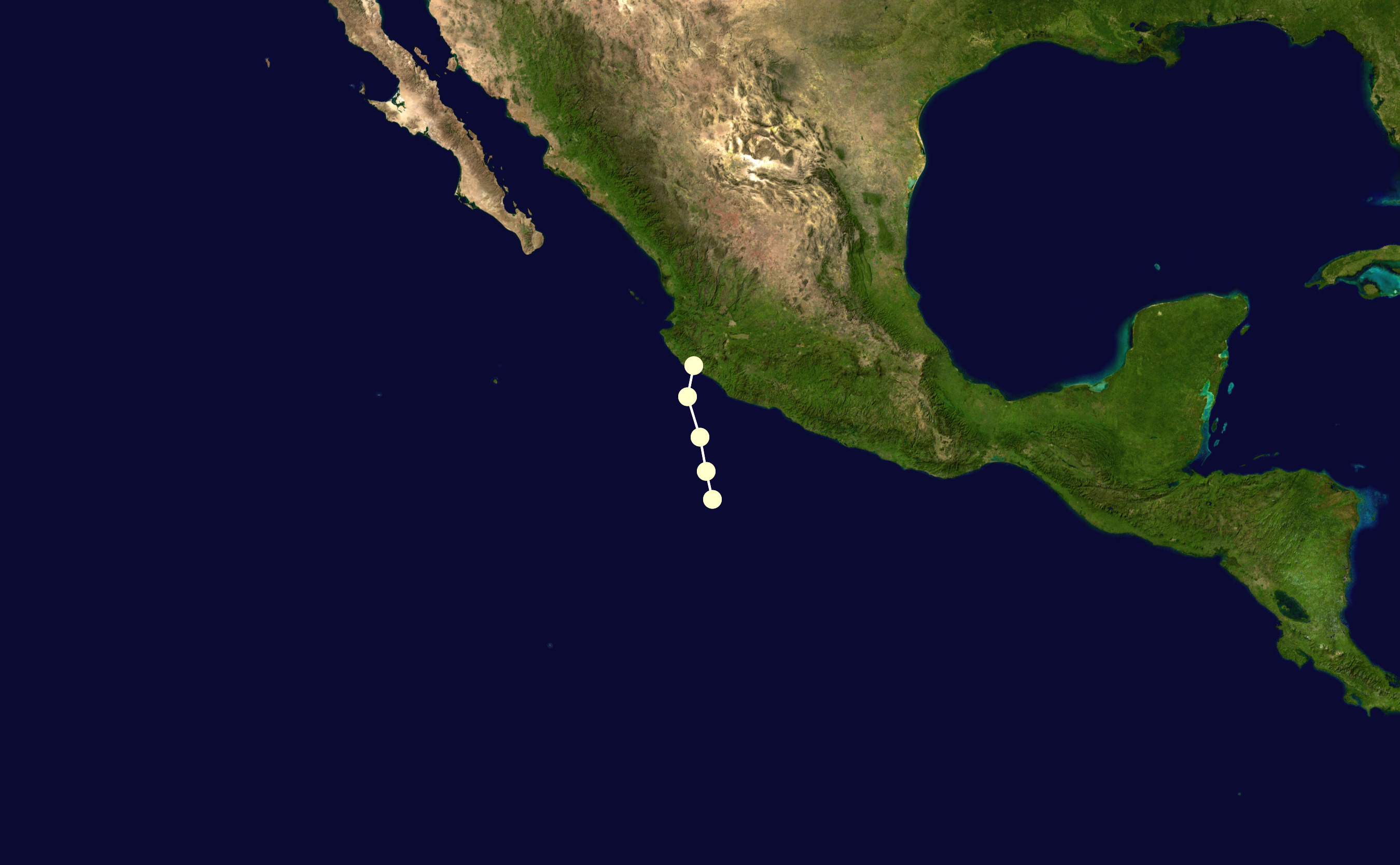
- Duration: October 15 – October 16
- Peak intensity: 85 mph (140 km/h) (1-min); 999 mbar (hPa)

In mid-October, a hurricane hit southwestern Mexico.

The hurricane killed 40 people in Atenquique, Jalisco, due to flooding. The storm produced floods across southwestern Mexico after heavy rainfall, affecting Jalisco, Colima, and Michoacán.

== See also ==
- List of Pacific hurricanes
- Pacific hurricane season
- 1955 Atlantic hurricane season
- 1955 Pacific typhoon season
- Australian region cyclone seasons: 1954–55 1955–56
- South Pacific cyclone seasons: 1954–55 1955–56
- South-West Indian Ocean cyclone seasons: 1954–55 1955–56
