= Timeline of the 2019 Pacific typhoon season =

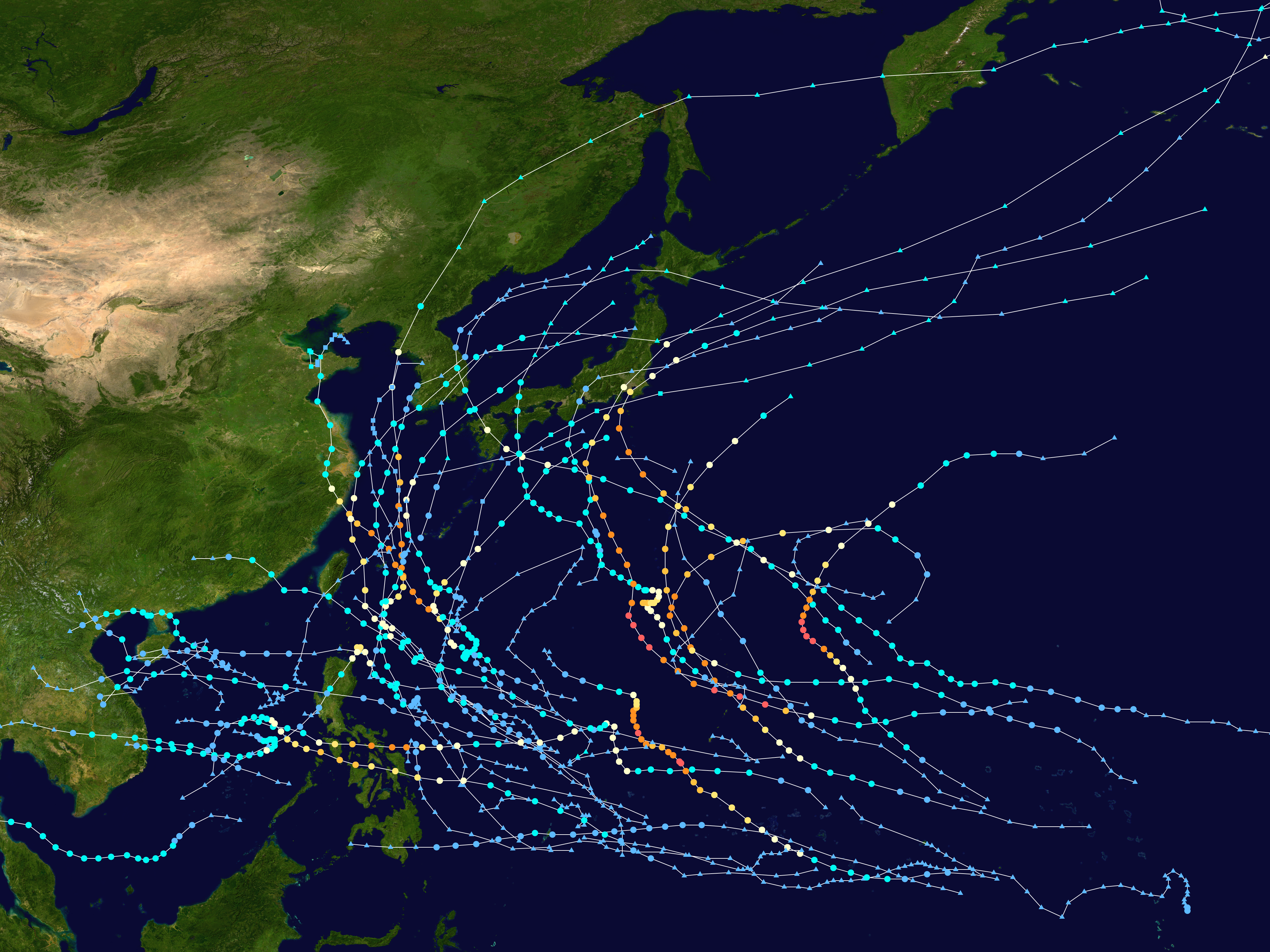
- Season summary map

Season boundaries
- First system formed: December 31, 2018
- Last system dissipated: December 29, 2019

Strongest system
- Name: Halong
- Maximum winds: 215 km/h (130 mph) (10-minute sustained)
- Lowest pressure: 905 hPa (mbar)

Longest lasting system
- Name: Wutip
- Duration: 11.75 days
Storm articles
- Tropical Storm Pabuk (2019)
- Tropical Depression Amang (2019)
- Typhoon Wutip (2019)
- Tropical Storm Danas (2019)
- Tropical Storm Wipha (2019)
- Typhoon Francisco (2019)
- Typhoon Lekima
- Typhoon Lingling (2019)
- Typhoon Faxai
- Typhoon Tapah (2019)
- Typhoon Mitag (2019)
- Typhoon Hagibis
- Typhoon Bualoi (2019)
- Cyclone Matmo–Bulbul
- Typhoon Nakri (2019)
- Typhoon Kammuri
- Typhoon Phanfone

The 2019 Pacific typhoon season was the annual cycle of tropical cyclone formation over the western North Pacific Ocean and the South China Sea, primarily in 2019. There were no official bounds, as tropical cyclones form all year round, though most storms in the basin typically form between July and November. The first tropical cyclone of the season, Tropical Storm Pabuk, developed in late December 2018; the final, Typhoon Phanfone, dissipated on December 29, 2019.

A total of 49 tropical depressions formed during the season; 29 of these developed into named tropical storms, of which 20 became severe tropical storms and 17 became typhoons. Additionally, five typhoons became super typhoons—an unofficial rank given by the United States Joint Typhoon Warning Center (JTWC) to storms with 1-minute maximum sustained wind speed of at least 240 km/h (150 mph). Activity in the 2019 season was greater than normal, (Note: Based on the climatological average of 25.6 storms from 1981 to 2010.) primarily due to high sea surface temperatures. El Niño conditions persisted from late 2018 to the second quarter of 2019. In February, Typhoon Wutip became the strongest recorded typhoon to occur during the month. The conditions became neutral during the northern summer, as strong activity occurred in the monsoon trough over Southeast Asia in August, promoting tropical cyclogenesis. In November, activity in the basin was driven by high sea surface temperatures along with an active phase of the Madden–Julian oscillation and equatorial waves.

Due to several very destructive tropical cyclones, the season was the costliest ever recorded. The most destructive system was Typhoon Hagibis, which inflicted damage to Japan that amounted to ¥1.88 trillion (US$17.3 billion) and killed 118 people, becoming the costliest typhoon when unadjusted for inflation until Typhoon Doksuri in 2023. In August, Typhoon Lekima struck China, becoming the second-costliest typhoon in Chinese history at the time. During the next month, Typhoon Lingling impacted the Korean Peninsula and killed eight people, and Typhoon Faxai made landfall over Japan, becoming the costliest disaster of 2019 until Hagibis. Typhoon Bualoi exacerbated the effects of Faxai and Hagibis, producing floods that caused damages of US$200 million and killed 13, despite not reaching land. The last two named storms, typhoons Kammuri and Phanfone, each made landfalls over the Philippines in December, causing ₱11.027 billion (US$212.910 million) of damages and 74 deaths combined.

The Japan Meteorological Agency (JMA) is the official Regional Specialized Meteorological Center for the Western Pacific Basin. As such, it is responsible for assigning names to all tropical cyclones that reach 10-minute maximum sustained winds of at least 65 kilometers per hour (40 miles per hour) in the region. The PAGASA assigns names to tropical cyclones that form or enter their area of responsibility as a tropical depression or stronger, regardless if the cyclone has been assigned a name by the JMA. The JTWC also monitors systems in the Western Pacific Basin, assigning systems a number with a "W" suffix if the system is a tropical depression or stronger. This timeline includes information from post-storm reviews by the JMA and the JTWC, as well as naming from the PAGASA. It documents tropical cyclone formations, strengthening, weakening, landfalls, extratropical transition, and dissipations during the season. Reports among warning centers often differ; therefore, information from both agencies has been included.

== Timeline of events ==
=== January ===
==== January 1 ====
- 00:00 UTC at 6.7°N 110.9°E – The JTWC reports that Tropical Depression 36W has intensified into a tropical storm.
- 06:00 UTC at 6.3°N 110.2°E – The JMA reports that Tropical Depression 36W has intensified into a tropical storm, assigning it the name Pabuk.

==== January 3 ====
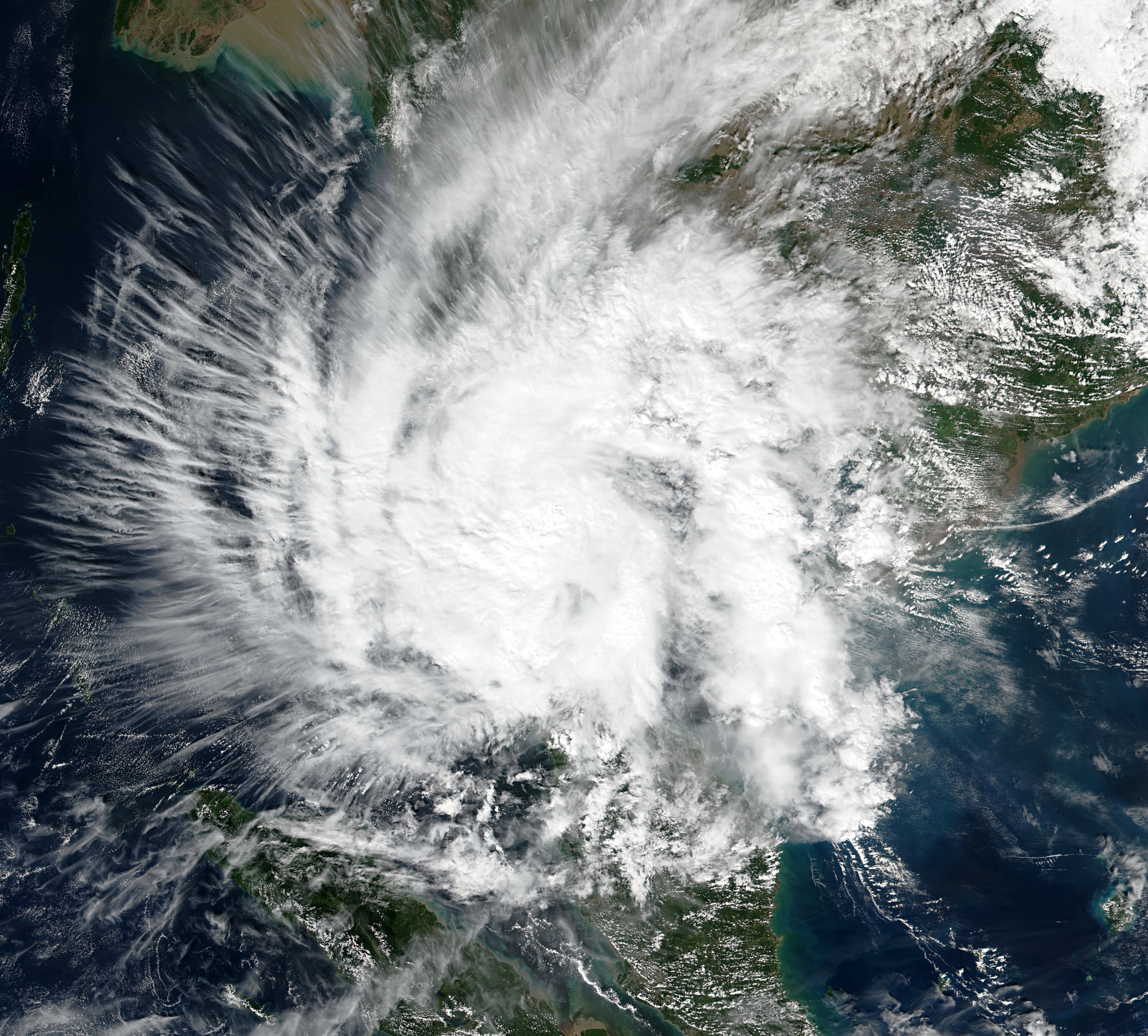
Satellite image of Tropical Storm Pabuk at its peak intensity and approaching Thailand on January 4

- 18:00 UTC at 7.5°N 102.5°E – The JMA reports that Tropical Storm Pabuk (36W) has reached its peak intensity, estimating maximum sustained winds of 85 km/h (50 mph) and a minimum barometric pressure of 996 hPa (29.41 inHg).

==== January 4 ====
- 00:00 UTC at 2.6°N 174.8°E – The JTWC reports that the first and only tropical depression of the month has formed, designating it 01W and estimating a minimum barometric pressure of 1,002 hPa (29.59 inHg).
- 05:45 UTC – Pabuk (36W) makes landfall over Pak Phanang, Nakhon Si Thammarat, Thailand. (Note: According to the Thai Meteorological Department. The time of landfall varies, as the JMA reported that Pabuk made landfall over the Malay Peninsula at 12:00 UTC.)
- 12:00 UTC at 2.9°N 174.7°E – The JTWC reports that Tropical Depression 01W has weakened into a tropical disturbance.
- 18:00 UTC at 8.4°N 99.4°E – Tropical Storm Pabuk (36W) crosses 100°E, entering the North Indian basin.

==== January 19 ====
- 06:00 UTC at 7.0°N 132.0°E – The JMA begins tracking Tropical Depression 01W, estimating a minimum barometric pressure of 1,004 hPa (29.65 inHg).
- 06:00 UTC at 6.8°N 132.4°E – The PAGASA reports that Tropical Depression 01W has formed within the Philippine Area of Responsibility (PAR), assigning it the local name Amang.

==== January 20 ====
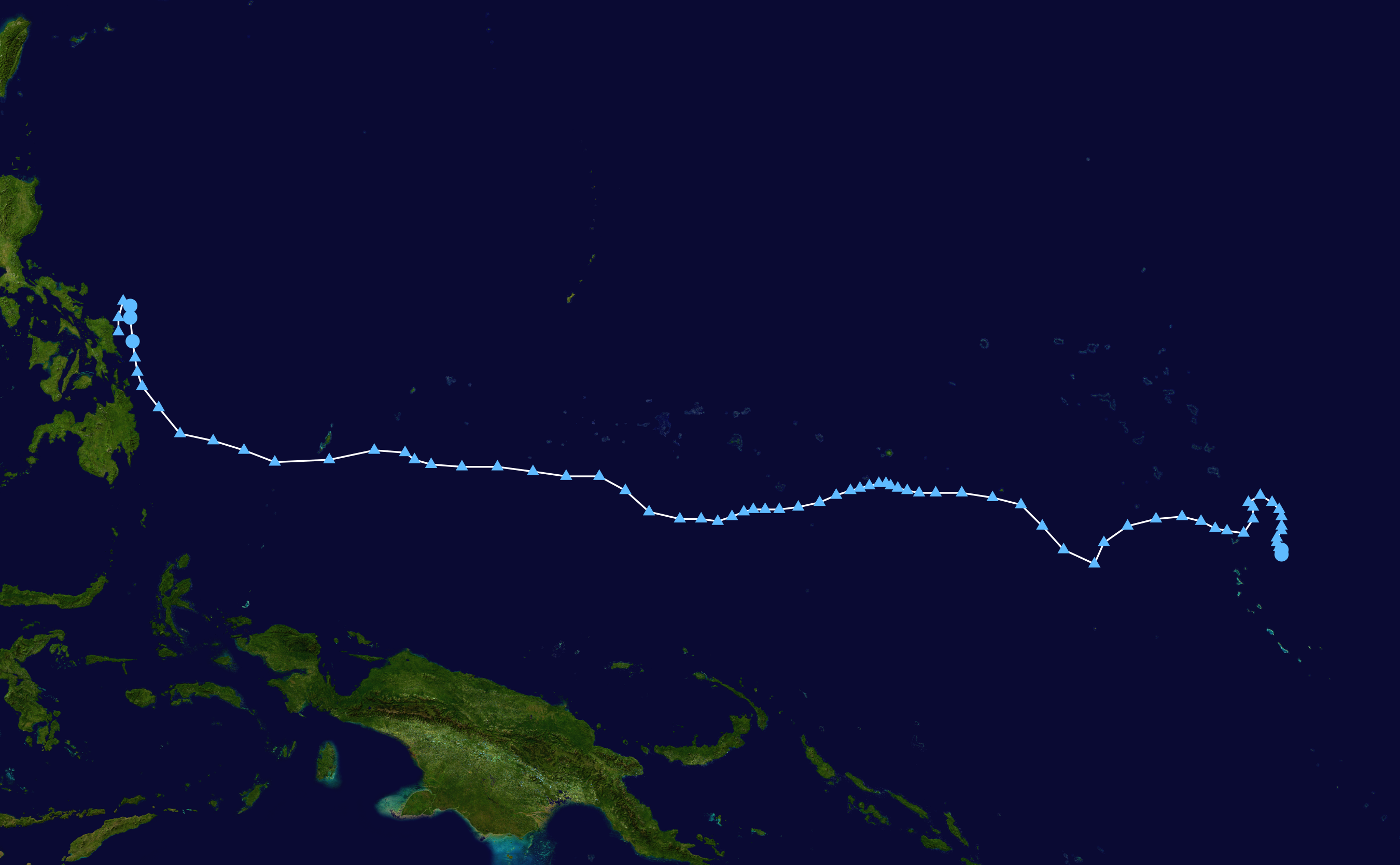
Storm path of Tropical Depression 01W (Amang)

- 00:00 UTC at 8.7°N 128.6°E – The JMA estimates Tropical Depression 01W's (Amang) maximum sustained winds at 55 km/h (35 mph).

==== January 21 ====
- 06:00 UTC at 11.6°N 126.3°E – The JTWC reports that Tropical Disturbance 01W (Amang) has intensified into a tropical depression.
- 12:00 UTC at 12.6°N 126.2°E – The JTWC reports that Tropical Depression 01W (Amang) has reached its peak intensity, estimating maximum 1-minute sustained winds of 55 km/h (35 mph) and a barometric pressure of 1,003 hPa (29.62 inHg).

==== January 22 ====
- 00:00 UTC at 13.3°N 125.9°E – The JTWC reports that Tropical Depression 01W (Amang) has weakened into a tropical disturbance.
- 06:00 UTC at 13.0°N 126.0°E – The JMA last notes Tropical Depression 01W (Amang).

=== February ===
==== February 18 ====
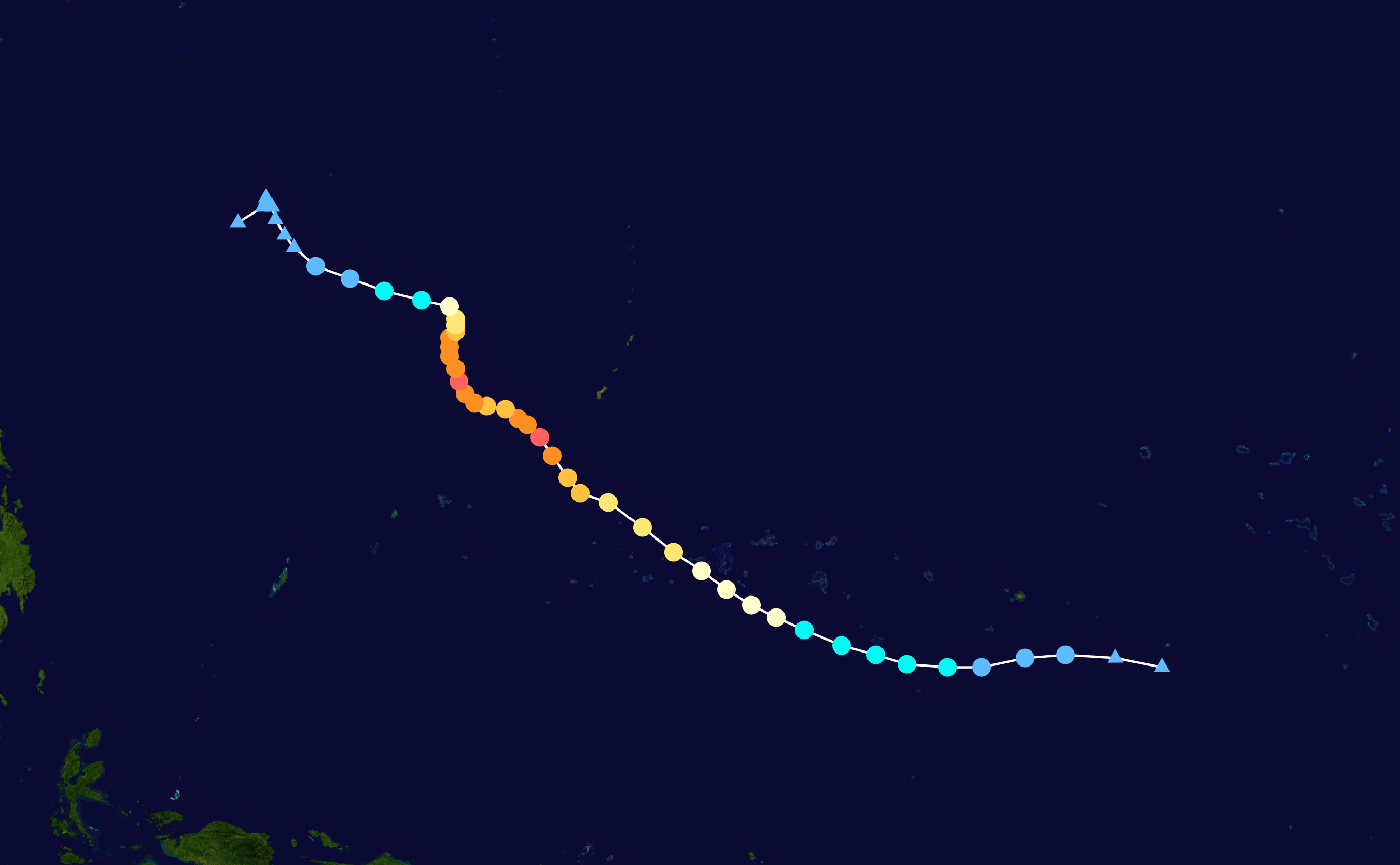
Storm path of Typhoon Wutip (Betty)

- 12:00 UTC at 4.7°N 162.5°E – The JMA reports that the first and only tropical depression of the month has formed.

==== February 19 ====
- 00:00 UTC at 5.0°N 159.7°E – The JTWC begins tracking the first tropical depression, designating it 02W.
- 18:00 UTC at 4.5°N 155.5°E – The JMA reports that Tropical Depression 02W has intensified into a tropical storm, assigning it the name Wutip.
- 18:00 UTC at 4.6°N 155.9°E – The JTWC reports that Tropical Depression Wutip (02W) has intensified into a tropical storm.

==== February 20 ====
- 06:00 UTC at 4.7°N 153.8°E – The JMA reports that Tropical Storm Wutip (02W) has intensified into a severe tropical storm.
- 18:00 UTC at 5.7°N 151.6°E – The JMA reports that Severe Tropical Storm Wutip (02W) has intensified into a typhoon.

==== February 21 ====
- 00:00 UTC at 6.2°N 150.4°E – The JTWC reports that Tropical Storm Wutip (02W) has intensified into a Category 1-equivalent typhoon on the Saffir–Simpson hurricane wind scale (SSHWS).

==== February 22 ====
- 00:00 UTC at 8.3°N 147.1°E – The JTWC reports that Typhoon Wutip (02W) has intensified into a Category 2-equivalent typhoon on the SSHWS.
- 18:00 UTC at 10.2°N 144.1°E – The JTWC reports that Typhoon Wutip (02W) has intensified into a Category 3-equivalent typhoon on the SSHWS.

==== February 23 ====
Infrared satellite animation of Typhoon Wutip undergoing an eyewall replacement cycle from February 23 to 25

- 00:00 UTC at 10.6°N 143.7°E – The JMA reports that Typhoon Wutip (02W) has intensified into a very strong typhoon.
- 06:00 UTC at 11.4°N 143.2°E – The JTWC reports that Typhoon Wutip (02W) has intensified into a Category 4-equivalent typhoon on the SSHWS.
- 10:00 UTC at 11.9°N 142.9°E – The JTWC reports that Typhoon Wutip (02W) has reached its peak intensity as a Category 5-equivalent super typhoon on the SSHWS, estimating maximum 1-minute sustained winds of 270 km/h (165 mph) and a minimum barometric pressure of 895 hPa (26.43 inHg).
- 12:00 UTC at 12.0°N 142.8°E – The JMA reports that Typhoon Wutip (02W) has reached its peak intensity as a violent typhoon, estimating maximum sustained winds of 195 km/h (120 mph) and a minimum barometric pressure of 920 hPa (27.17 inHg).
- 18:00 UTC at 12.4°N 142.4°E – The JTWC reports that Super Typhoon Wutip (02W) has weakened into a Category 4-equivalent super typhoon on the SSHWS.

==== February 24 ====
- 00:00 UTC at 12.6°N 142.1°E – The JTWC reports that Super Typhoon Wutip (02W) has weakened into a typhoon.
- 06:00 UTC at 12.9°N 141.7°E – The JMA reports that Typhoon Wutip (02W) has weakened from a violent typhoon into a very strong typhoon.
- 06:00 UTC at 12.9°N 141.7°E – The JTWC reports that Typhoon Wutip (02W) has weakened into a Category 3-equivalent typhoon on the SSHWS.
- 18:00 UTC at 13.1°N 140.7°E – The JTWC reports that Typhoon Wutip (02W) has intensified into a Category 4-equivalent typhoon on the SSHWS.

==== February 25 ====
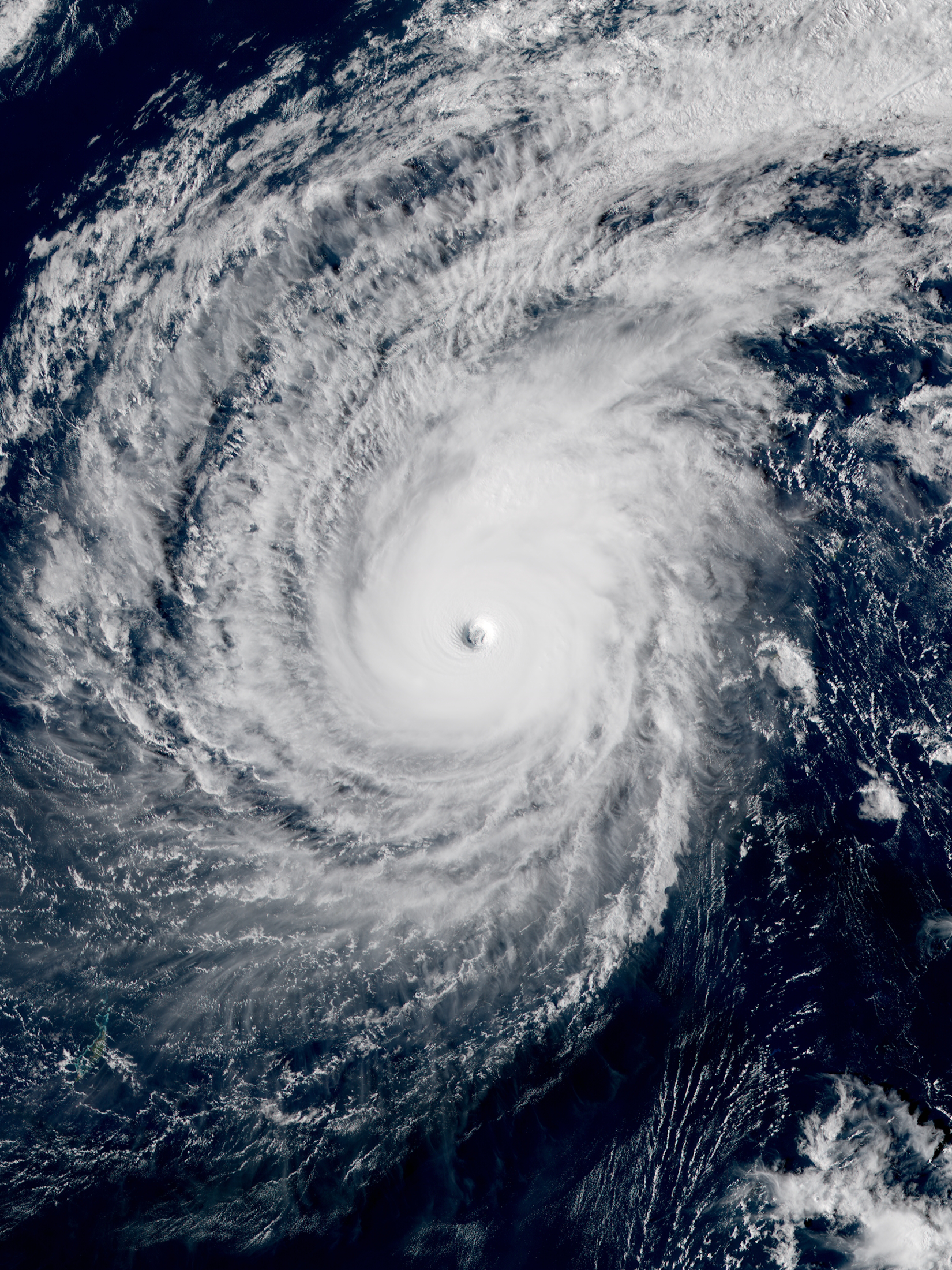
Satellite image of Typhoon Wutip at its secondary peak intensity west of Guam on February 25

- 00:00 UTC at 13.4°N 140.4°E – The JMA reports that Typhoon Wutip (02W) has reached its secondary peak intensity, estimating maximum sustained winds of 185 km/h (115 mph) and a minimum barometric pressure of 935 hPa (27.61 inHg).
- 06:00 UTC at 13.8°N 140.2°E – The JTWC reports that Typhoon Wutip (02W) has reached its secondary peak intensity as a Category 5-equivalent super typhoon on the SSHWS, estimating maximum 1-minute sustained winds of 260 km/h (160 mph) and a barometric pressure of 918 hPa (27.11 inHg).
- 12:00 UTC at 14.2°N 140.1°E – The JTWC reports that Super Typhoon Wutip (02W) has weakened into a Category 4-equivalent super typhoon on the SSHWS.
- 18:00 UTC at 14.6°N 139.9°E – The JTWC reports that Super Typhoon Wutip (02W) has weakened into a typhoon.

==== February 26 ====
- 12:00 UTC at 15.4°N 140.1°E – The JTWC reports that Typhoon Wutip (02W) has weakened into a Category 3-equivalent typhoon on the SSHWS.
- 18:00 UTC at 15.7°N 140.1°E – The JMA reports that Typhoon Wutip (02W) has weakened from a very strong typhoon into a typhoon.
- 18:00 UTC at 15.6°N 140.1°E – The JTWC reports that Typhoon Wutip (02W) has weakened into a Category 2-equivalent typhoon on the SSHWS.

==== February 27 ====
- 06:00 UTC at 16.2°N 139.9°E – The JTWC reports that Typhoon Wutip (02W) has weakened into a Category 1-equivalent typhoon on the SSHWS.
- 12:00 UTC at 16.5°N 139.0°E – The JMA reports that Typhoon Wutip (02W) has weakened into a severe tropical storm.
- 12:00 UTC at 16.4°N 139.0°E – The JTWC reports that Typhoon Wutip (02W) has weakened into a tropical storm.

==== February 28 ====
- 00:00 UTC at 17.2°N 136.7°E – The JMA reports that Severe Tropical Storm Wutip (02W) has weakened into a tropical storm.
- 00:00 UTC at 17.1°N 136.7°E – The JTWC reports that Tropical Storm Wutip (02W) has weakened into a tropical depression.
- 06:00 UTC at 17.6°N 135.6°E – The JMA reports that Tropical Storm Wutip (02W) has weakened into a tropical depression.
- 12:00 UTC at 18.1°N 134.9°E – The JTWC reports that Tropical Depression Wutip (02W) has weakened into a tropical disturbance.
- 12:00 UTC at 18.2°N 134.9°E – The PAGASA reports that Tropical Depression Wutip (02W) has entered the PAR, assigning it the local name Betty.

=== March ===
==== March 2 ====
- 06:00 UTC at 18.9°N 133.1°E – The JMA last notes Tropical Depression Wutip (02W); it dissipates six hours later.

==== March 14 ====
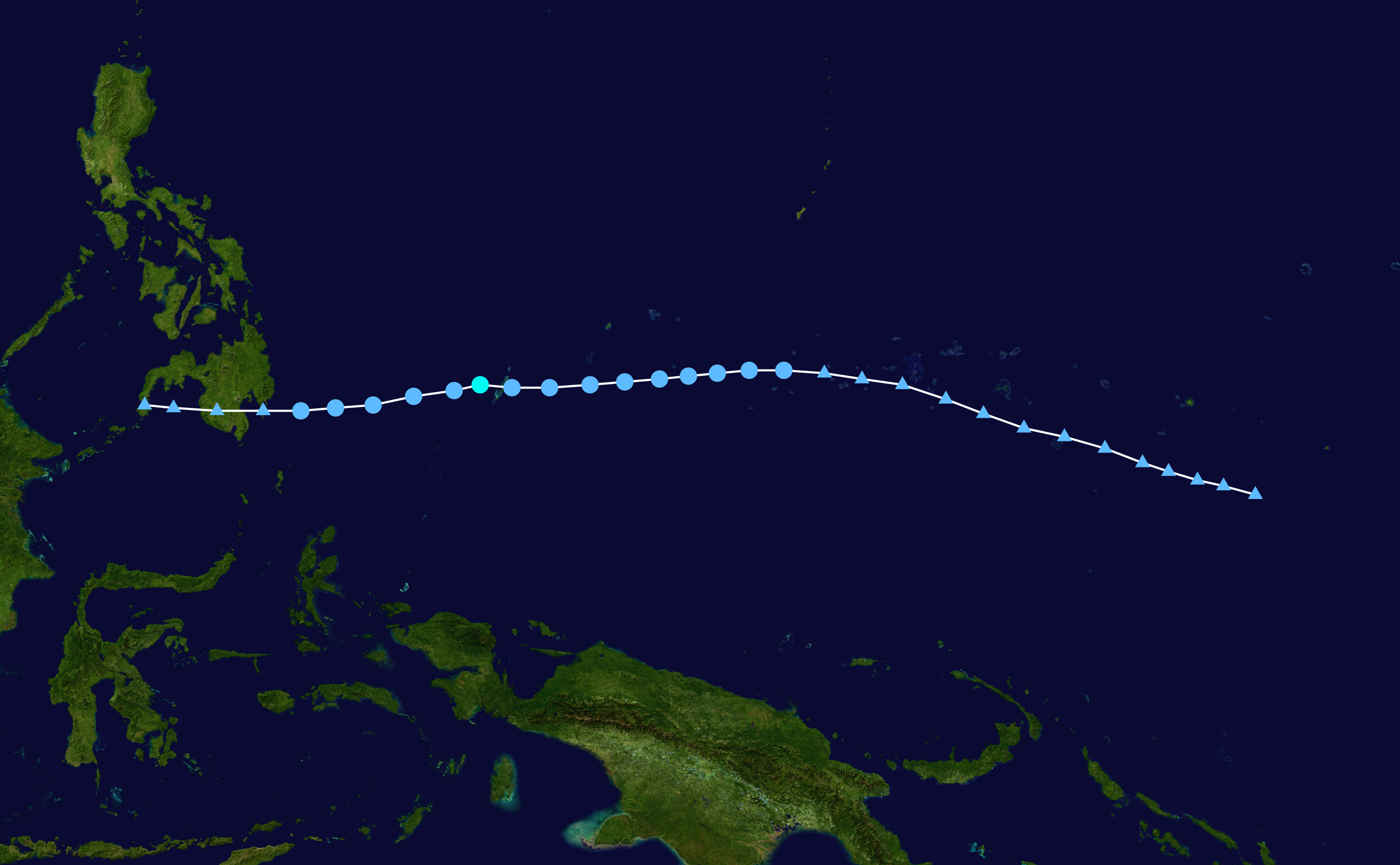
Storm path of Tropical Depression 03W (Chedeng)

- 06:00 UTC at 7.0°N 149.0°E – The JMA reports that the first and only tropical depression of the month has formed, estimating a minimum barometric pressure of 1,006 hPa (29.71 inHg).

==== March 15 ====
- 00:00 UTC at 8.0°N 144.2°E – The JTWC begins tracking the tropical depression, designating it 03W and estimating a minimum barometric pressure of 1,001 hPa (29.56 inHg).

==== March 17 ====
- 00:00 UTC at 7.6°N 134.9°E – The PAGASA reports that Tropical Depression 03W has entered the PAR, assigning it the local name Chedeng.
- 06:00 UTC at 7.5°N 133.7°E – The JTWC reports that Tropical Depression 03W (Chedeng) has reached its peak intensity as a tropical storm, estimating maximum 1-minute sustained winds of 65 km/h (40 mph).
- 12:00 UTC at 7.3°N 132.8°E – The JTWC reports that Tropical Storm 03W (Chedeng) has weakened into a tropical depression.

==== March 18 ====
- 18:00 UTC at 6.6°N 126.2°E – The JTWC reports that Tropical Depression 03W (Chedeng) has weakened into a tropical disturbance.
- 18:00 UTC – 03W (Chedeng) makes its first landfall near Mati City, Davao Oriental in the Philippines.
- 21:00 UTC – 03W (Chedeng) makes its second and final landfall near Malita, Davao Oriental in the Philippines.

==== March 19 ====
- 06:00 UTC at 6.0°N 123.0°E – The JMA last notes Tropical Depression 03W (Chedeng).

=== April ===
- No tropical cyclones formed in April.

=== May ===
==== May 7 ====
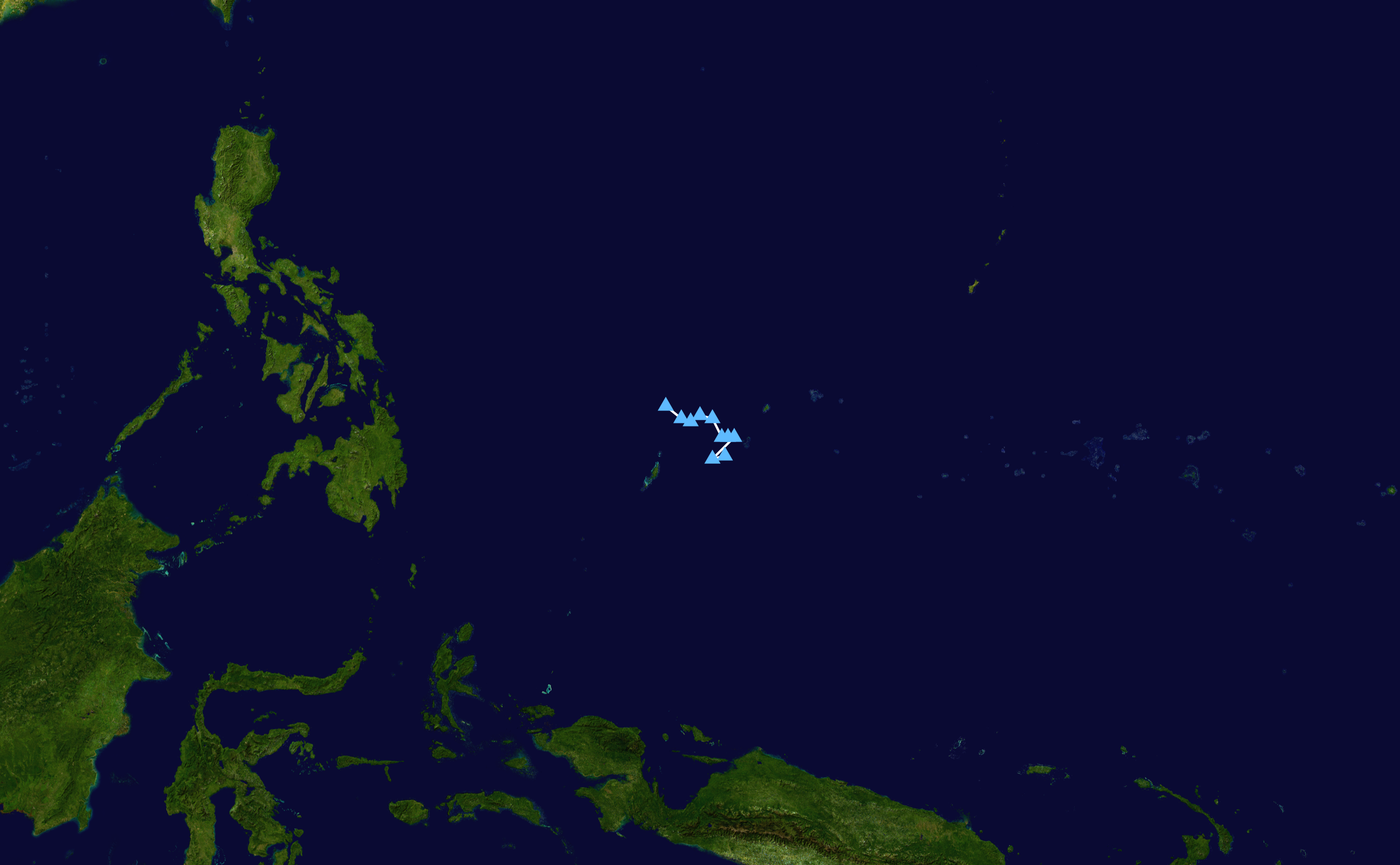
Storm path of the first tropical depression

- 00:00 UTC at 8.0°N 137.0°E – The JMA reports that the first tropical depression of the month has formed.
- 00:00 UTC at 5.0°N 162.0°E – The JMA reports that a second tropical depression has formed.
- 06:00 UTC at 8.0°N 137.0°E – The JMA reports that the first tropical depression has reached a minimum barometric pressure of 1,004 hPa (29.65 inHg).

==== May 8 ====
- 06:00 UTC at 9.0°N 136.0°E – The JMA last notes the first tropical depression for the first time.
- 06:00 UTC at 4.0°N 164.0°E – The JMA reports that the second tropical depression has reached a minimum barometric pressure of 1,004 hPa (29.65 inHg).

==== May 10 ====
- 00:00 UTC at 10.0°N 133.0°E – The JMA reports that the first tropical depression has re-developed.

==== May 11 ====
- 00:00 UTC at 9.0°N 130.0°E – The JMA last notes the first tropical depression for the second and final time.

==== May 12 ====
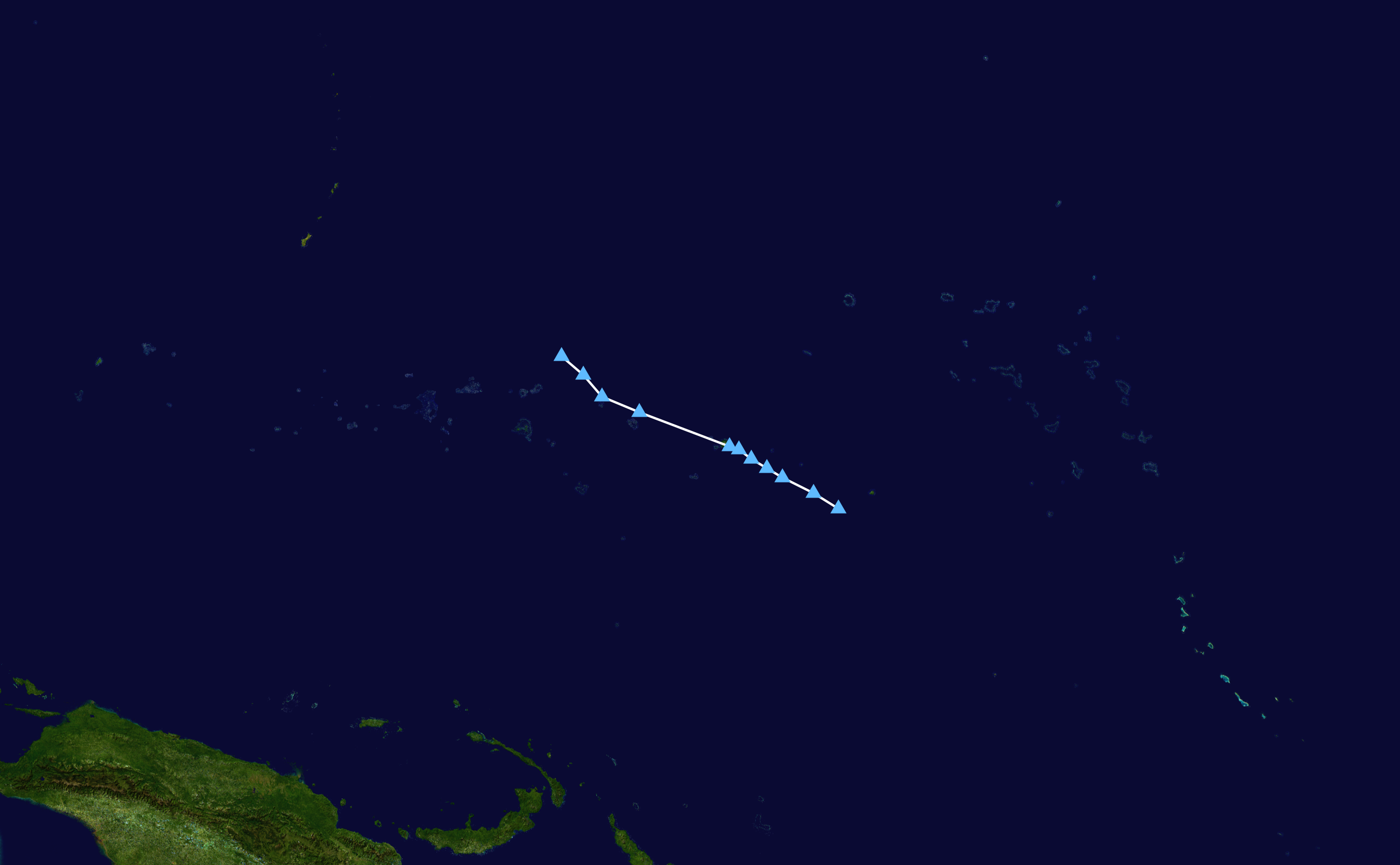
Storm path of the second tropical depression

- 18:00 UTC at 9.0°N 153.0°E – The JMA last notes the second tropical depression for the first time.

==== May 13 ====
- 06:00 UTC at 10.0°N 130.0°E – The JMA reports that the second tropical depression has re-developed.

==== May 15 ====
- 06:00 UTC at 11.0°N 150.0°E – The JMA last notes the second tropical depression for the second and final time.

=== June ===
==== June 24 ====
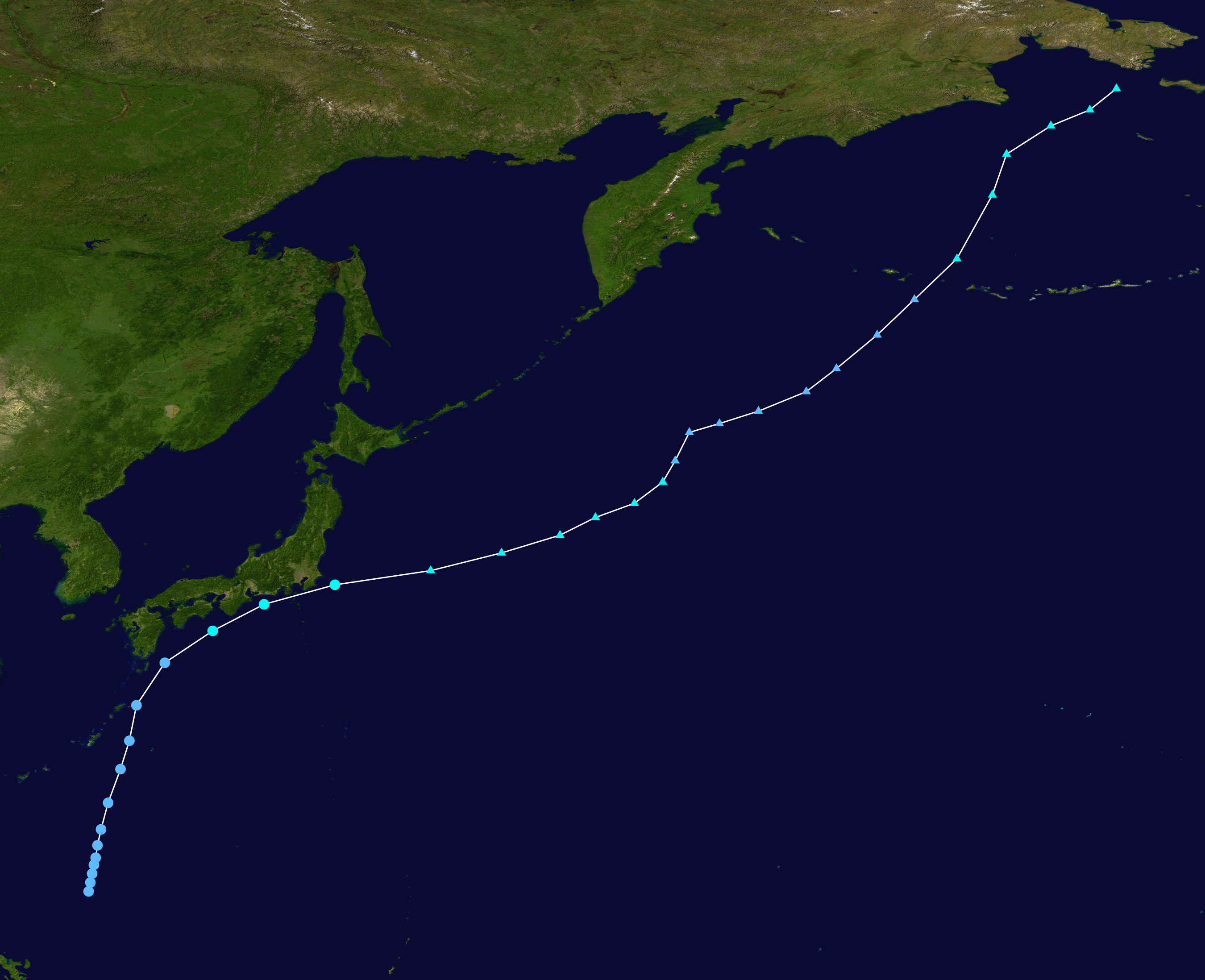
Storm path of Tropical Storm Sepat (Dodong)

- 12:00 UTC at 17.9°N 127.7°E – The JMA reports that the first tropical depression of the month has formed.

==== June 25 ====
- 06:00 UTC at 19.6°N 127.6°E – The PAGASA reports that the first tropical depression has formed within the PAR, assigning it the local name Dodong.

==== June 26 ====
- 00:00 UTC at 26.1°N 126.5°E – The JMA reports that a second tropical depression has formed.
- 12:00 UTC at 29.3°N 127.5°E – The JMA last notes the second tropical depression.
- 14:00 UTC – The PAGASA reports that Tropical Depression Dodong has exited the PAR.
- 18:00 UTC at 26.5°N 129.3°E – The JTWC begins tracking the first system, assessing it as a subtropical depression and leaving it designated as Invest 94W.

==== June 27 ====
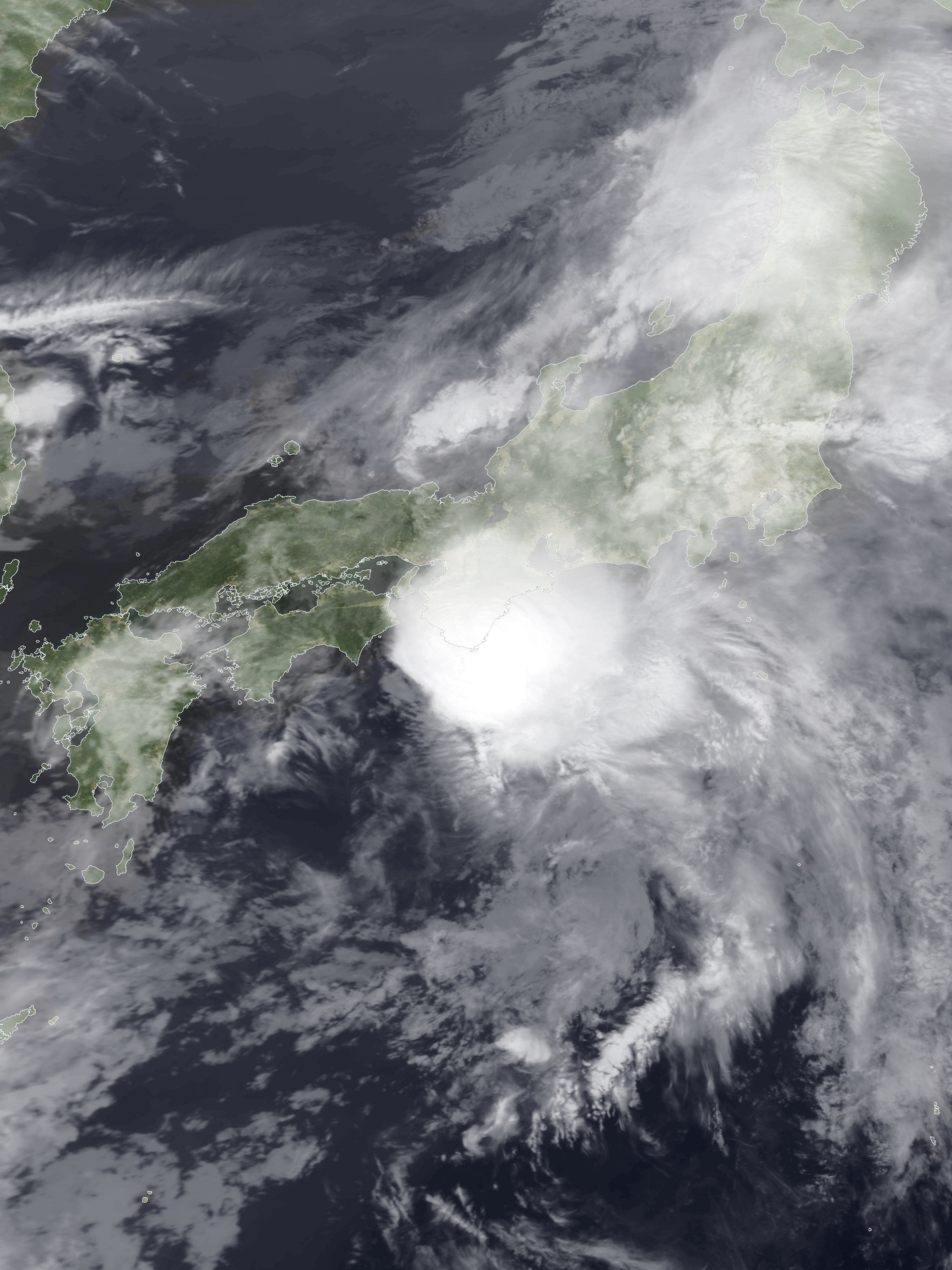
Infrared satellite image of Tropical Storm Sepat shortly before reaching peak winds on June 27

- 06:00 UTC at 11.0°N 136.0°E – The JMA reports that a third tropical depression has formed.
- 12:00 UTC at 32.6°N 134.7°E – The JMA reports that the first tropical depression has intensified into a tropical storm, assigning it the name Sepat.
- 12:00 UTC at 32.6°N 134.2°E – The JTWC reports that Subtropical Depression 94W (Sepat) has reached its peak intensity as a subtropical storm, estimating maximum 1-minute sustained winds of 75 km/h (45 mph) and a minimum barometric pressure of 993 hPa (29.32 inHg).
- 18:00 UTC at 34.1°N 137.6°E – The JMA reports that Tropical Storm Sepat has reached its peak winds, estimating maximum sustained winds of 75 km/h (45 mph).
- 18:00 UTC at 12.0°N 135.0°E – The JMA last notes the third tropical depression for the first time.

==== June 28 ====
- 00:00 UTC at 35.2°N 141.6°E – The JMA reports that Tropical Storm Sepat has reached a minimum barometric pressure of 994 hPa (29.35 inHg).
- 00:00 UTC at 12.3°N 134.2°E – The JTWC begins tracking the third tropical depression, designating it 04W.
- 00:00 UTC at 12.2°N 134.1°E – The PAGASA reports that Tropical Depression 04W has formed within the PAR, assigning it the local name Egay.
- 06:00 UTC at 36.0°N 147.0°E – The JMA reports that Tropical Storm Sepat has transitioned into an extratropical cyclone.
- 12:00 UTC – The JTWC reports that Subtropical Storm 94W (Sepat) has transitioned into an extratropical cyclone.
- 12:00 UTC at 13.0°N 133.0°E – The JMA reports that Tropical Depression 04W (Egay) has re-developed.

==== June 29 ====
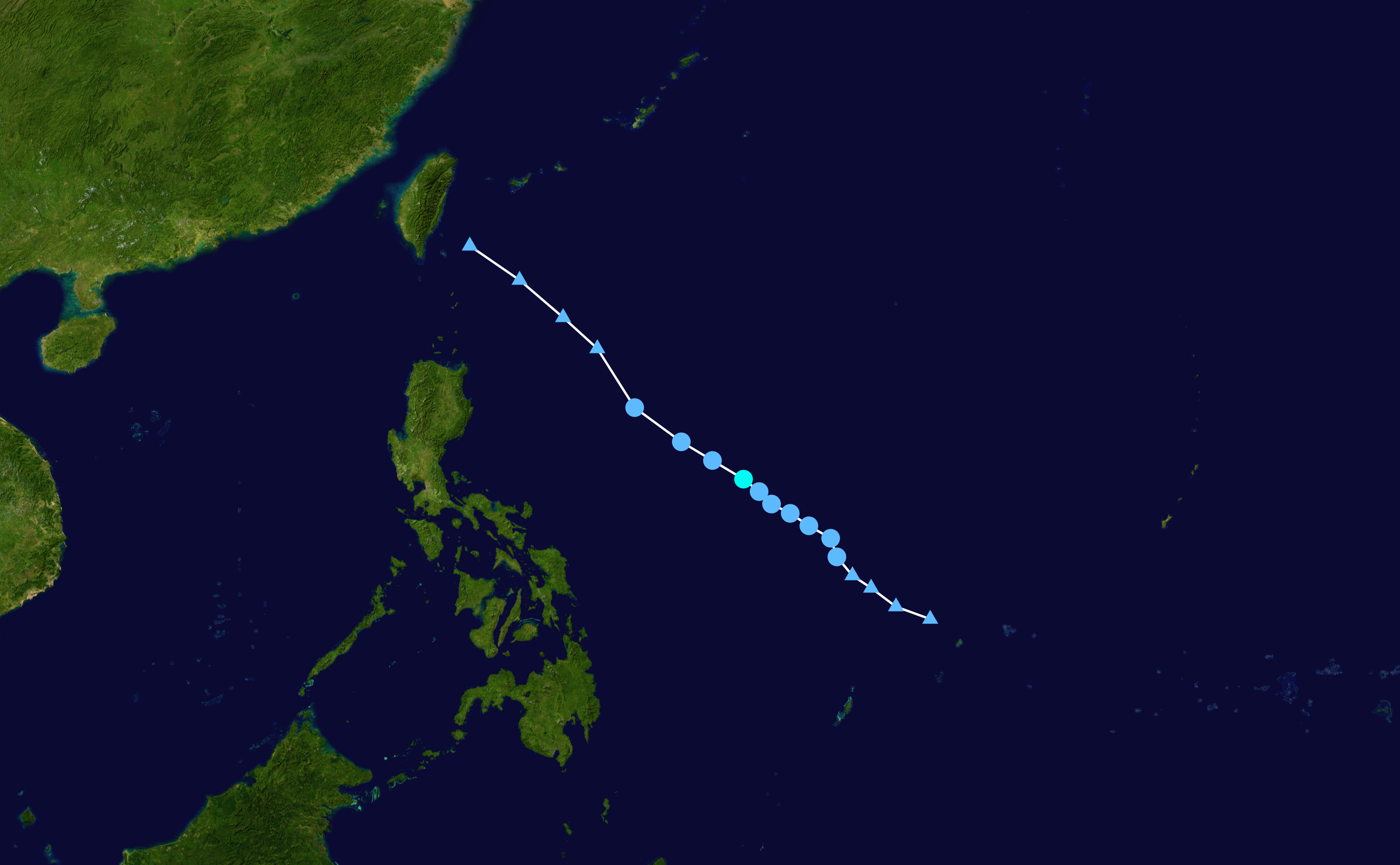
Storm path of Tropical Depression 04W (Egay)

- 12:00 UTC at 14.8°N 131.2°E – The JTWC reports that Tropical Depression 04W (Egay) has reached its peak intensity as a tropical storm, estimating maximum 1-minute sustained winds of 65 km/h (40 mph) and a minimum barometric pressure of 998 hPa (29.47 inHg).
- 18:00 UTC at 15.4°N 130.2°E – The JTWC reports that Tropical Storm 04W (Egay) has weakened into a tropical depression.

==== June 30 ====
- 12:00 UTC at 19.0°N 126.5°E – The JTWC reports that Tropical Depression 04W (Egay) has weakened into a tropical disturbance.

=== July ===
==== July 1 ====
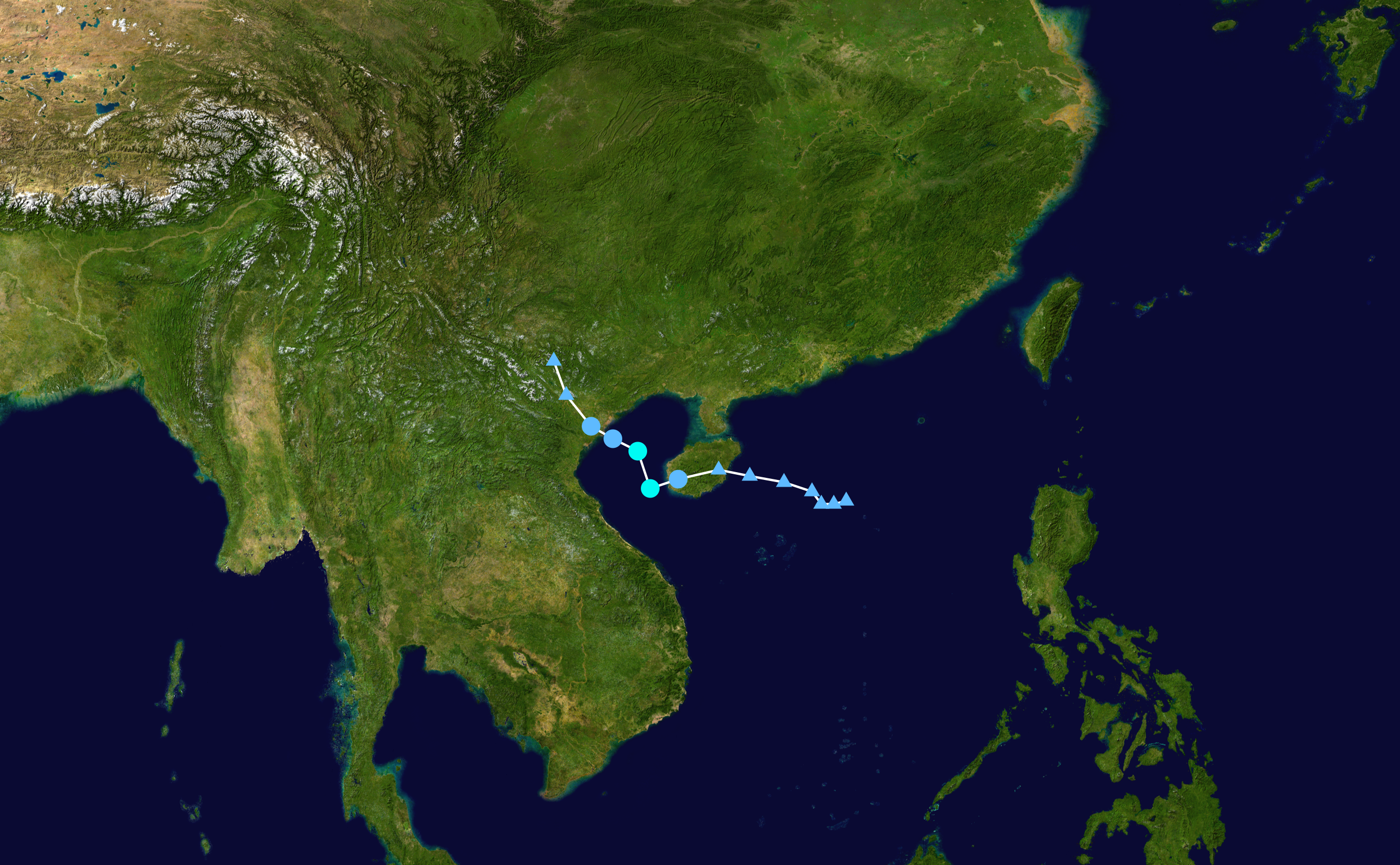
Storm path of Tropical Storm Mun

- 18:00 UTC at 23.0°N 122.0°E – The JMA last notes Tropical Depression 04W (Egay) for the second and final time.
- 18:00 UTC at 18.0°N 114.0°E – The JMA reports that the first tropical depression of the month has formed.

==== July 2 ====
- 06:00 UTC at 18.8°N 112.4°E – The JMA reports that the first tropical depression has reached its peak winds as a tropical storm, assigning it the name Mun and estimating maximum sustained winds of 65 km/h (40 mph).
- 16:45 UTC – Mun makes its first landfall over Wanning, Hainan, China.

==== July 3 ====
- 00:00 UTC at 18.8°N 109.0°E – The JTWC begins tracking Tropical Depression Mun, designating it 05W.
- 06:00 UTC at 19.5°N 108.4°E – The JMA reports that Tropical Storm Mun has reached a minimum barometric pressure of 992 hPa (29.29 inHg).
- 06:00 UTC at 18.5°N 108.1°E – The JTWC reports that Tropical Depression Mun (05W) has reached its peak winds as a tropical storm, estimating maximum 1-minute sustained winds of 65 km/h (40 mph).
- 12:00 UTC at 19.7°N 107.7°E – The JTWC reports that Tropical Storm Mun (05W) has reached a minimum barometric pressure of 992 hPa (29.29 inHg).
- 18:00 UTC at 20.1°N 106.9°E – The JTWC reports that Tropical Storm Mun (05W) has weakened into a tropical depression.
- 22:45 UTC – Mun makes its second and final landfall over the coast of Thái Bình Province, Vietnam.

==== July 4 ====
- 06:00 UTC at 21.6°N 105.4°E – The JMA reports that Tropical Storm Mun (05W) has weakened into a tropical depression.
- 06:00 UTC at 21.5°N 105.4°E – The JTWC reports that Tropical Depression Mun (05W) has weakened into a tropical disturbance.
- 18:00 UTC at 23.1°N 103.8°E – The JMA last notes Tropical Depression Mun (05W); it dissipates six hours later.

==== July 14 ====
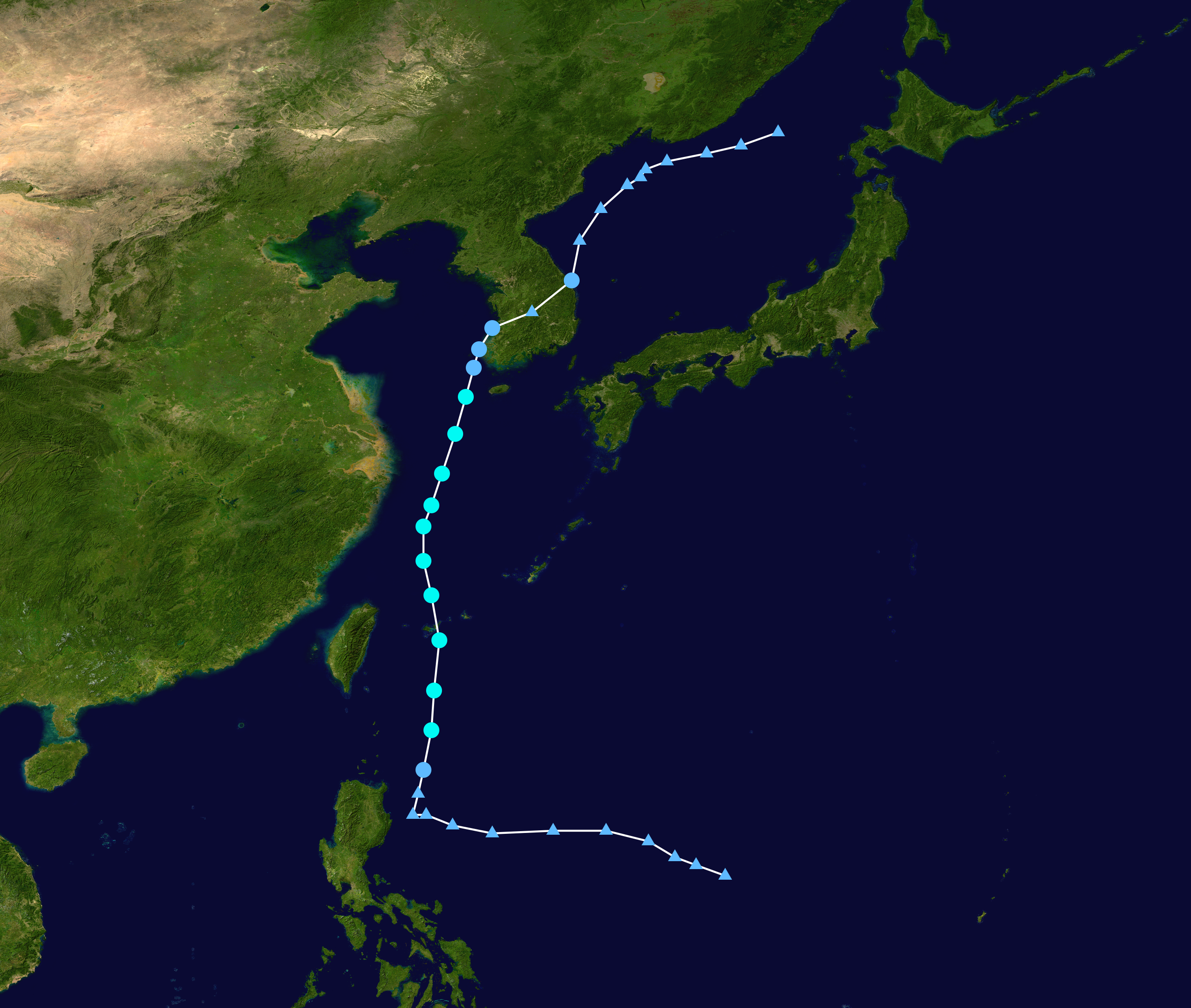
Storm path of Tropical Storm Danas (Falcon)

- 00:00 UTC at 12.6°N 136.7°E – The JMA reports that a second tropical depression has formed.
- 08:00 UTC – The PAGASA reports that the second tropical depression has entered the PAR, assigning it the local name Falcon.

==== July 16 ====
- 06:00 UTC at 17.1°N 124.9°E – The JMA reports that Tropical Depression Falcon has intensified into a tropical storm, assigning it the name Danas.

==== July 17 ====
- 06:00 UTC at 19.0°N 123.7°E – The JTWC begins tracking Tropical Depression Danas, designating it 06W.
- 06:00 UTC at 17.4°N 118.7°E – The PAGASA reports that a third tropical depression has formed within the PAR, assigning it the local name Goring.
- 12:00 UTC at 20.5°N 124.0°E – The JTWC reports that Tropical Depression Danas (06W) has intensified into a tropical storm.
- 12:00 UTC at 17.0°N 119.0°E – The JMA begins tracking Tropical Depression Goring.

==== July 18 ====
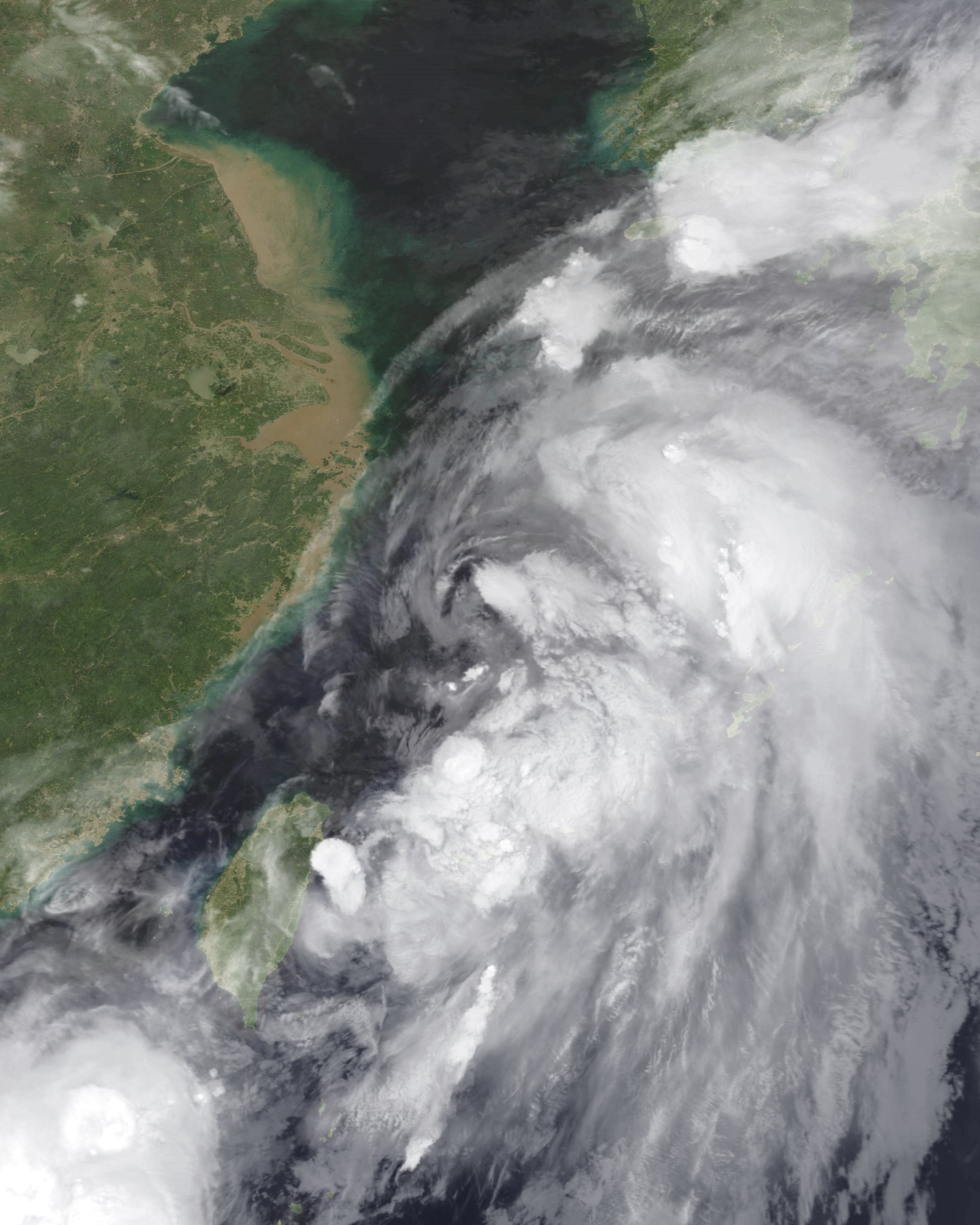
Infrared satellite image of Tropical Storm Danas at its peak intensity near the coast of China on July 18

- 04:00 UTC – The PAGASA reports that Tropical Storm Danas (06W) has exited the PAR.
- 12:00 UTC at 26.9°N 123.7°E – The JTWC reports that Tropical Storm Danas (06W) has reached its peak intensity, estimating maximum 1-minute sustained winds of 85 km/h (50 mph) and a minimum barometric pressure of 984 hPa (29.06 inHg).
- 18:00 UTC at 27.8°N 124.0°E – The JMA reports that Tropical Storm Danas (06W) has reached its peak intensity, estimating maximum sustained winds of 85 km/h (50 mph) and a minimum barometric pressure of 985 hPa (29.09 inHg).
- >18:00 UTC – The PAGASA reports that Goring has re-entered the PAR, after it had briefly exited the area.
- 22:00 UTC – Goring makes landfall in the southern portion of Pingtung County, Taiwan.

==== July 19 ====
- 06:00 UTC at 23.6°N 122.7°E – The JMA last notes Tropical Depression Goring.
- 12:00 UTC at 24.7°N 122.6°E – The PAGASA reports that Tropical Depression Goring has weakened into a low-pressure area, as its remnants were absorbed by Danas (06W).

==== July 20 ====
- 00:00 UTC at 34.2°N 125.6°E – The JTWC reports that Tropical Storm Danas (06W) has weakened into a tropical depression.
- 13:00 UTC – Danas (06W) makes landfall near Gunsan, North Jeolla Province, South Korea.
- 18:00 UTC at 36.6°N 127.2°E – The JMA reports that Tropical Storm Danas (06W) has weakened into a tropical depression.
- 18:00 UTC at 36.3°N 127.8°E – The JTWC reports that Tropical Depression Danas (06W) has weakened into a tropical disturbance.

==== July 21 ====
- 00:00 UTC at 37.5°N 129.3°E – The JTWC reports that Tropical Disturbance Danas (06W) has intensified into a tropical depression.
- 06:00 UTC at 39.1°N 130.9°E – The JTWC reports that Tropical Depression Danas (06W) has weakened into a tropical disturbance.
- 12:00 UTC at 40.2°N 130.4°E – The JMA reports that Tropical Depression Danas (06W) has transitioned into an extratropical cyclone.

==== July 24 ====
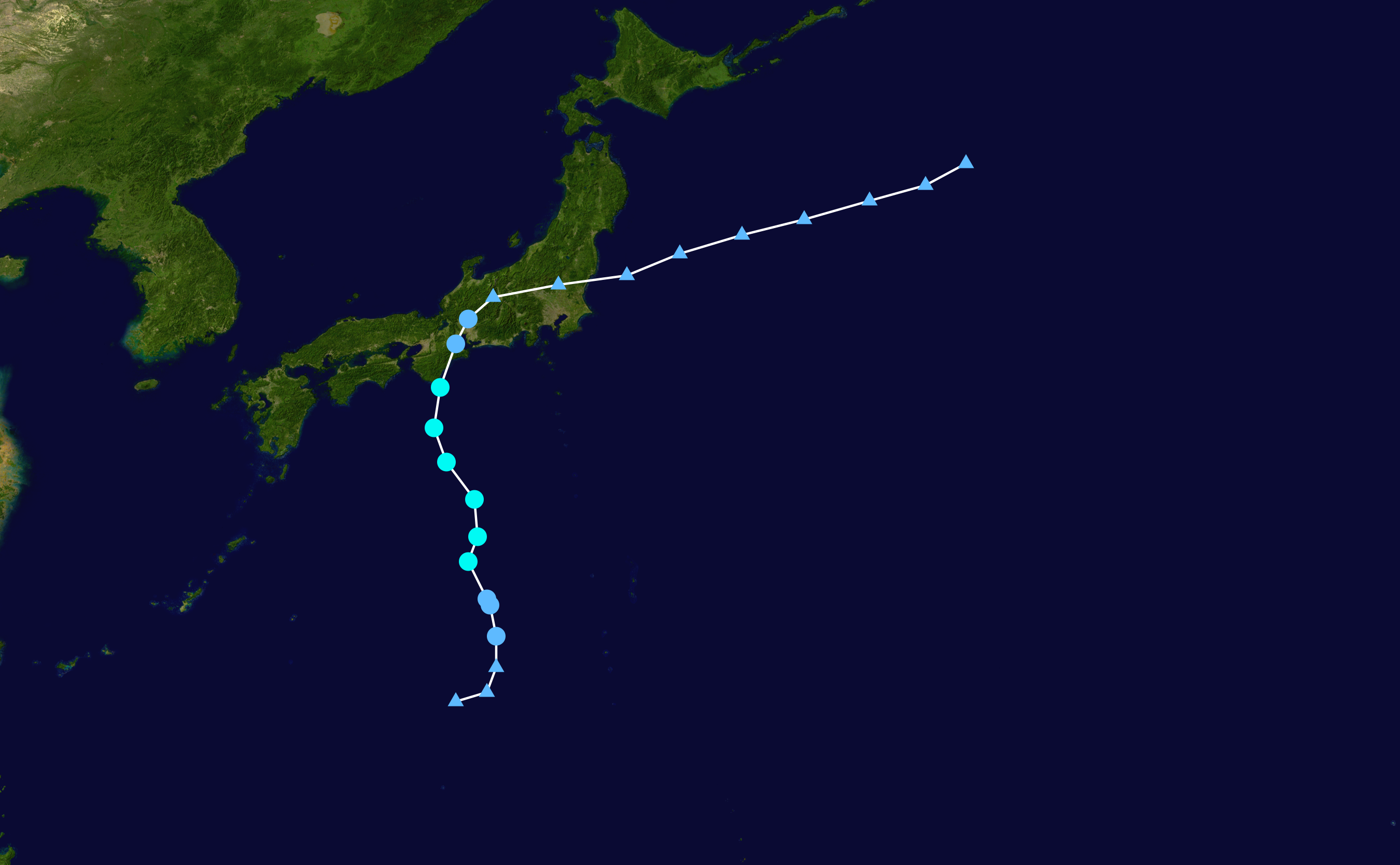
Storm path of Tropical Storm Nari

- 00:00 UTC at 23.0°N 137.0°E – The JMA reports that a fourth tropical depression has formed.
- 18:00 UTC at 25.3°N 137.8°E – The JTWC begins tracking the fourth tropical depression, designating it 07W.

==== July 25 ====
- 12:00 UTC at 27.7°N 136.9°E – The JTWC reports that Tropical Depression 07W has reached its peak winds as a tropical storm, estimating maximum 1-minute sustained winds of 65 km/h (40 mph).
- 18:00 UTC at 28.5°N 137.3°E – The JMA reports that Tropical Depression 07W has reached its peak winds as a tropical storm, assigning it the name Nari and estimating maximum sustained winds of 65 km/h (40 mph).

==== July 26 ====
- 18:00 UTC at 33.4°N 135.9°E – The JMA reports that Tropical Storm Nari (07W) has reached a minimum barometric pressure of 998 hPa (29.47 inHg).
- 18:00 UTC at 33.3°N 136.0°E – The JTWC reports that Tropical Storm Nari (07W) has reached a minimum barometric pressure of 991 hPa (29.26 inHg).
- ~22:00 UTC – Nari (07W) makes landfall over the southern part of Mie Prefecture, Japan.

==== July 27 ====
- 00:00 UTC at 34.7°N 136.5°E – The JTWC reports that Tropical Storm Nari (07W) has weakened into a tropical depression.
- 06:00 UTC at 35.6°N 136.7°E – The JMA reports that Tropical Storm Nari (07W) has weakened into a tropical depression.
- 12:00 UTC at 36.2°N 137.7°E – The JTWC reports that Tropical Depression Nari (07W) has weakened into a tropical disturbance.

==== July 28 ====
- 00:00 UTC at 36.9°N 142.0°E – The JMA reports that Tropical Depression Nari (07W) has transitioned into an extratropical cyclone.

==== July 30 ====
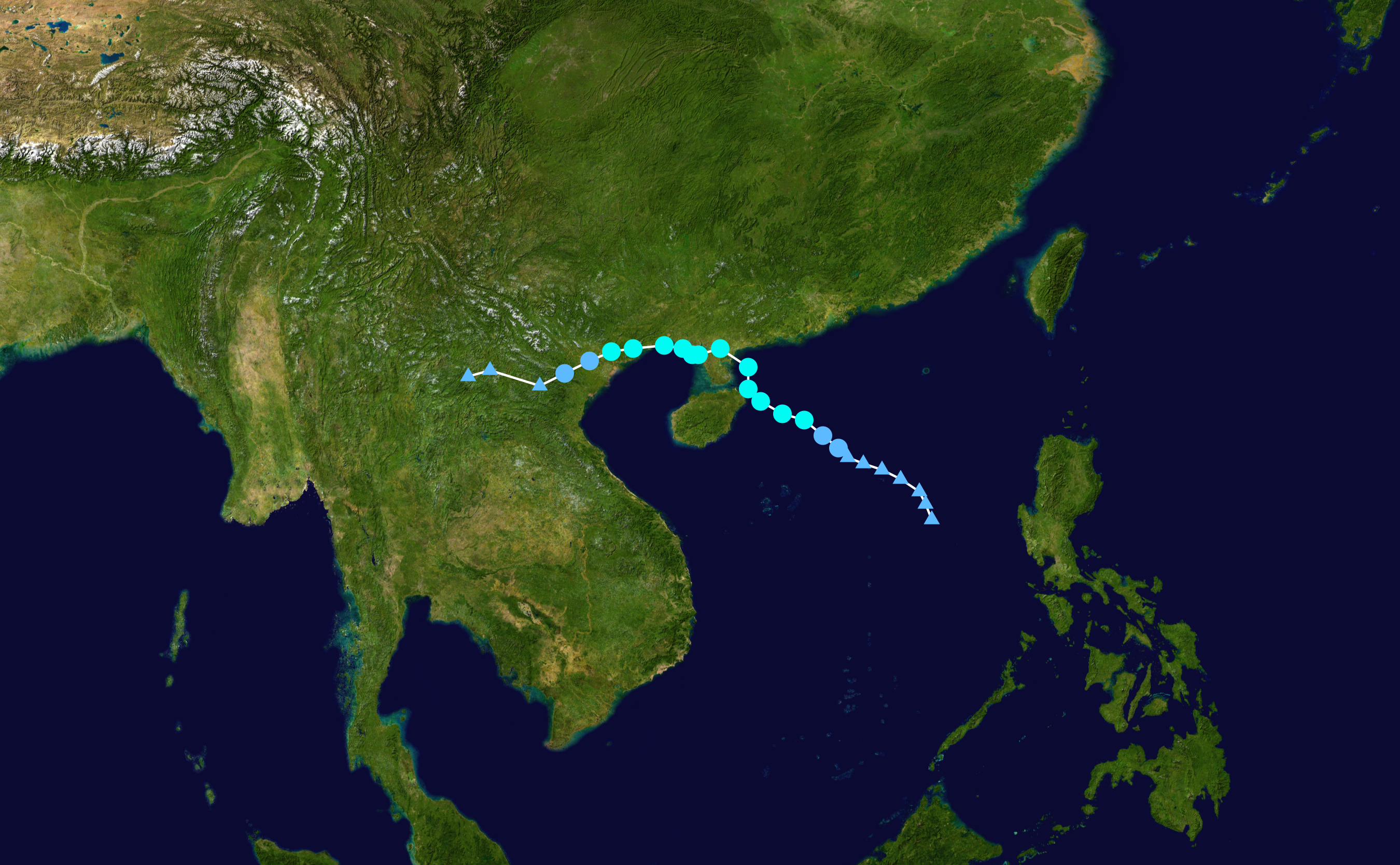
Storm path of Tropical Storm Wipha

- 00:00 UTC at 17.1°N 116.0°E – The JMA reports that a fifth tropical depression has formed.
- 12:00 UTC at 17.9°N 114.3°E – The JTWC begins tracking the fifth tropical depression, designating it 08W.
- 18:00 UTC at 18.4°N 114.2°E – The JMA reports that Tropical Depression 08W has intensified into a tropical storm, assigning it the name Wipha.

==== July 31 ====
- 06:00 UTC at 19.1°N 112.9°E – The JTWC reports that Tropical Depression Wipha (08W) has intensified into a tropical storm.
- 17:50 UTC – Wipha (08W) makes landfall over Wenchang, Hainan, China.

=== August ===
==== August 1 ====
- 00:00 UTC at 17.4°N 154.7°E – The JMA reports that the first tropical depression of the month has formed.
- 00:00 UTC at 20.1°N 111.1°E – The JTWC reports that Tropical Storm Wipha (08W) has reached an initial minimum barometric pressure of 989 hPa (29.21 inHg).
- 06:00 UTC at 20.8°N 111.1°E – The JTWC reports that Tropical Storm Wipha (08W) has reached its initial maximum 1-minute sustained winds of 85 km/h (50 mph).
- 09:40 UTC – Wipha (08W) makes its second landfall over Zhanjiang, Guangdong, China.
- 12:00 UTC at 18.9°N 154.0°E – The JTWC begins tracking the first tropical depression, designating it 09W.

==== August 2 ====
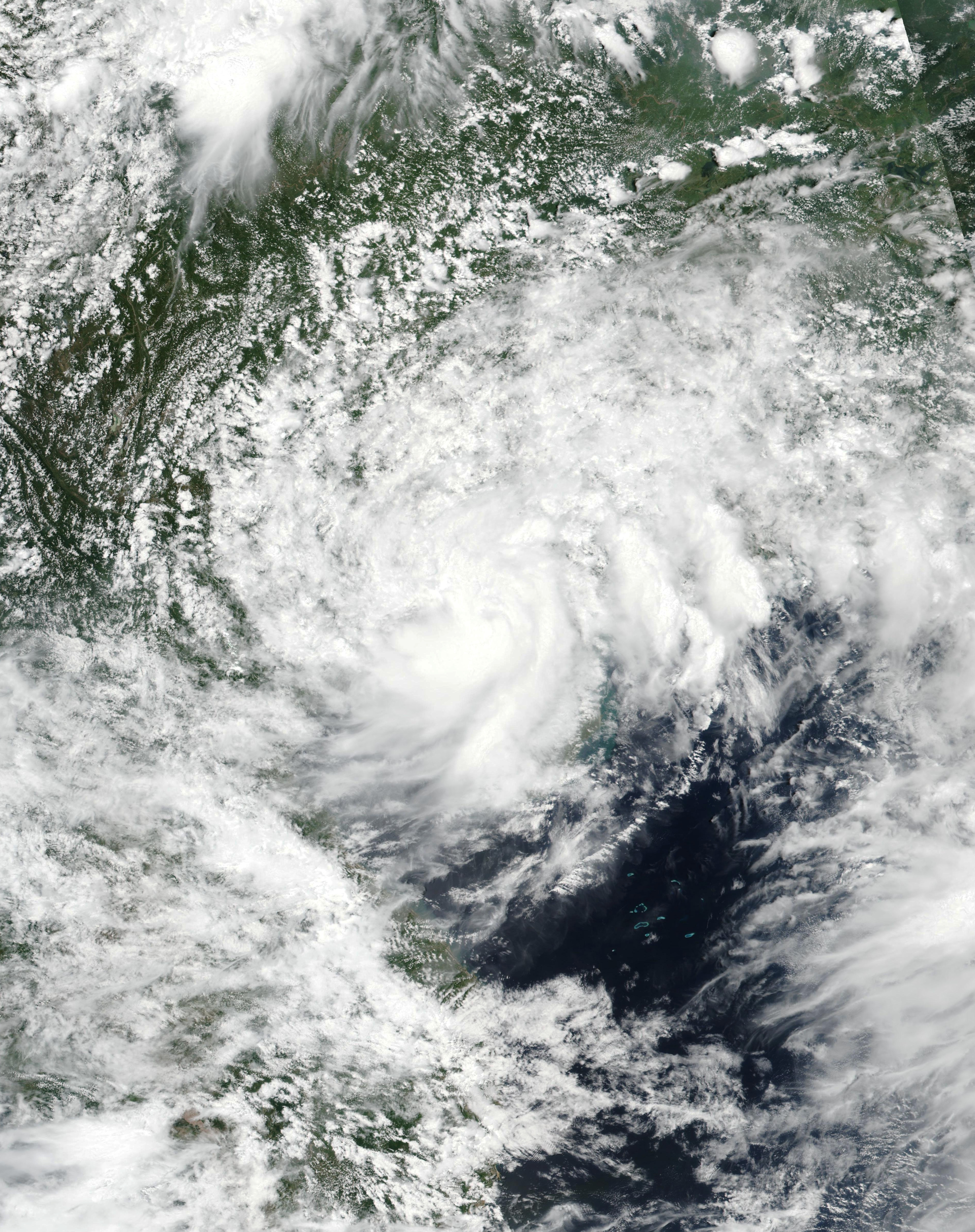
Satellite image of Tropical Storm Wipha at its peak intensity in the Gulf of Tonkin on August 2

- 00:00 UTC at 20.3°N 152.8°E – The JTWC reports that Tropical Depression 09W has intensified into a tropical storm.
- 06:00 UTC at 21.1°N 109.0°E – The JMA reports that Tropical Storm Wipha (08W) has reached its peak intensity, estimating maximum sustained winds of 85 km/h (50 mph) and a minimum barometric pressure of 985 hPa (29.09 inHg).
- 06:00 UTC at 14.5°N 134.3°E – The JMA reports that a second tropical depression has formed.
- 12:00 UTC at 21.5°N 108.4°E – The JTWC reports that Tropical Storm Wipha (08W) has reached its peak intensity, estimating maximum 1-minute sustained winds of 100 km/h (65 mph) and a minimum barometric pressure of 983 hPa (29.03 inHg).
- 12:00 UTC at 22.3°N 151.2°E – The JMA reports that Tropical Depression 09W has intensified into a tropical storm, assigning it the name Francisco.
- 13:20 UTC – Wipha (08W) makes its third and final landfall over Fangchenggang, Guangxi, China.

==== August 3 ====
- 06:00 UTC at 21.0°N 106.0°E – The JTWC reports that Tropical Storm Wipha (08W) has weakened into a tropical depression.
- 06:00 UTC at 15.1°N 132.6°E – The PAGASA reports that the second tropical depression has formed within the PAR, assigning it the local name Hanna.
- 12:00 UTC at 20.2°N 105.4°E – The JMA reports that Tropical Storm Wipha (08W) has weakened into a tropical depression.
- 18:00 UTC at 20.2°N 104.4°E – The JTWC reports that Tropical Depression Wipha (08W) has weakened into a tropical disturbance.
- 21:00 UTC at 27.1°N 143.9°E – The JMA reports that Tropical Storm Francisco (09W) has intensified into a severe tropical storm.

==== August 4 ====
- 00:00 UTC at 16.1°N 131.6°E – The JTWC begins tracking Tropical Depression Hanna, designating it 10W.
- 06:00 UTC at 20.5°N 102.1°E – The JMA last notes Tropical Depression Wipha (08W); it dissipates six hours later.
- 06:00 UTC at 16.9°N 130.6°E – The JMA reports that Tropical Depression 10W (Hanna) has intensified into a tropical storm, assigning it the name Lekima.
- 12:00 UTC at 17.7°N 131.1°E – The JTWC reports that Tropical Depression Lekima (10W) has intensified into a tropical storm.

==== August 5 ====
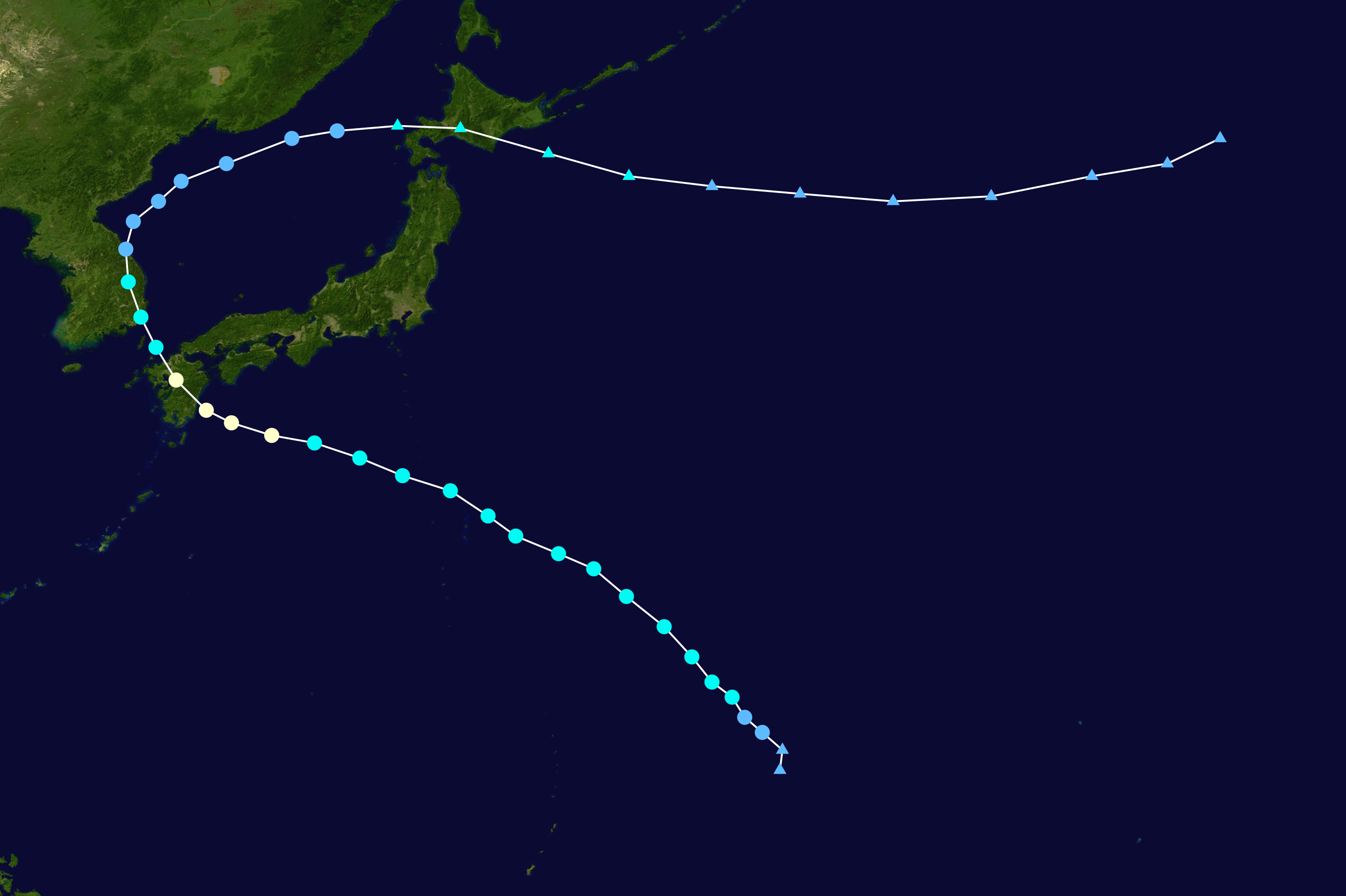
Storm path of Typhoon Francisco

- 00:00 UTC at 15.6°N 147.7°E – The JMA reports that a third tropical depression has formed.
- 06:00 UTC at 30.7°N 134.5°E – The JTWC reports that Tropical Storm Francisco (09W) has intensified into a Category 1-equivalent typhoon on the SSHWS.
- 09:00 UTC at 31.0°N 133.8°E – The JMA reports that Severe Tropical Storm Francisco (09W) has intensified into a typhoon.
- 12:00 UTC at 31.2°N 133.0°E – The JMA reports that Typhoon Francisco (09W) has reached its peak intensity, estimating maximum sustained winds of 130 km/h (80 mph) and a minimum barometric pressure of 970 hPa (28.64 inHg).
- 18:00 UTC at 31.7°N 131.9°E – The JTWC reports that Typhoon Francisco (09W) has reached its peak intensity, estimating maximum 1-minute sustained winds of 150 km/h (90 mph) and a minimum barometric pressure of 966 hPa (28.53 inHg).
- 18:00 UTC at 18.5°N 129.5°E – The JMA reports that Tropical Storm Lekima (10W) has intensified into a severe tropical storm.
- 18:00 UTC at 17.3°N 144.4°E – The JTWC begins tracking the third tropical depression, designating it 11W.
- 20:00 UTC – Francisco makes its first landfall over Miyazaki, Miyazaki Prefecture, Japan.

==== August 6 ====
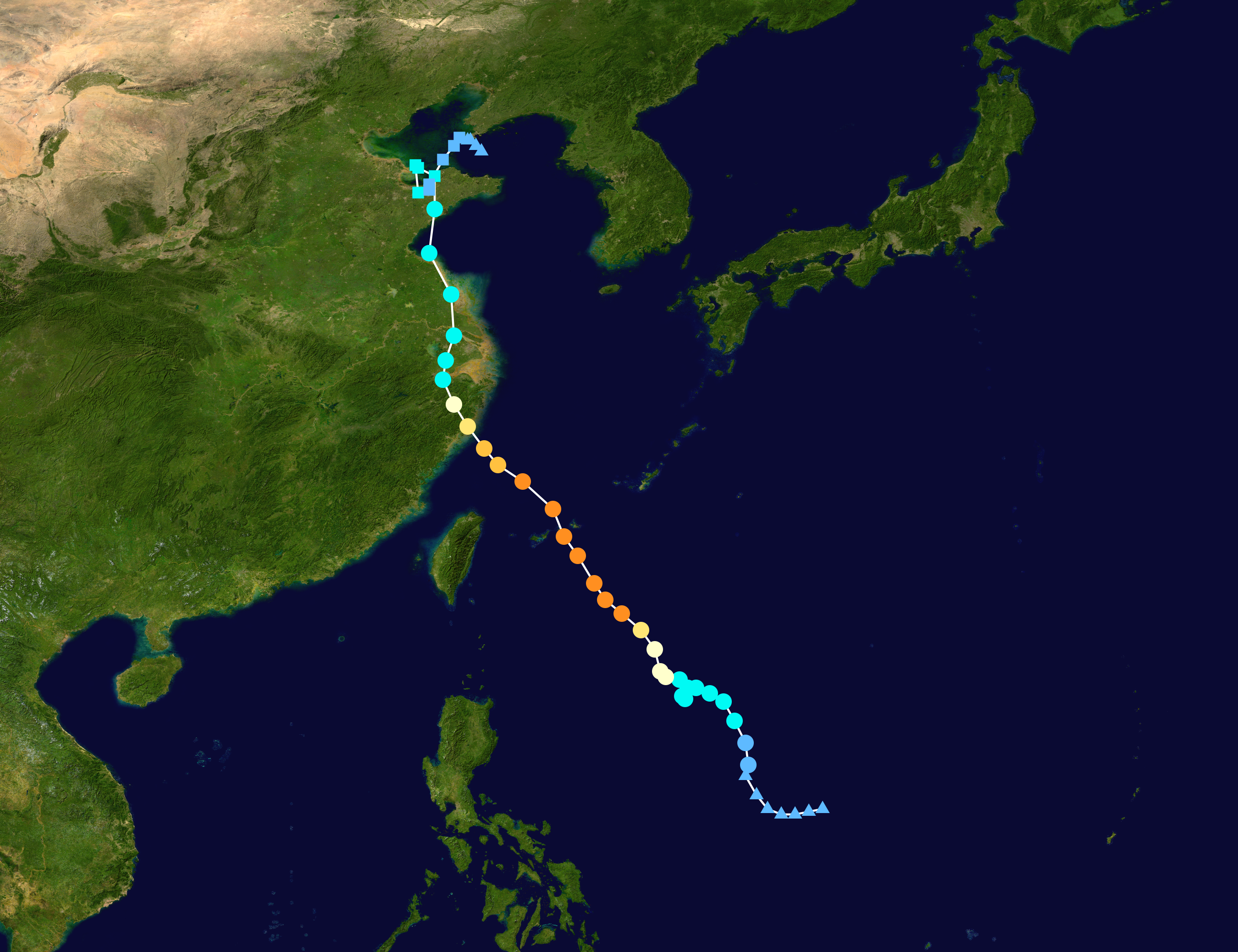
Storm path of Typhoon Lekima (Hanna)

- 00:00 UTC at 32.8°N 130.6°E – The JMA reports that Typhoon Francisco (09W) has weakened into a tropical storm.
- 00:00 UTC at 17.7°N 143.8°E – The JTWC reports that Tropical Depression 11W has intensified into a tropical storm.
- 06:00 UTC at 34.2°N 129.9°E – The JTWC reports that Typhoon Francisco (09W) has weakened into a tropical storm.
- 06:00 UTC at 18.5°N 142.8°E – The JMA reports that Tropical Depression 11W has intensified into a tropical storm, assigning it the name Krosa.
- 11:20 UTC – Francisco (09W) makes its second and final landfall near Busan, South Korea.
- 12:00 UTC at 19.5°N 128.7°E – The JMA reports that Severe Tropical Storm Lekima (10W) has intensified into a typhoon.
- 12:00 UTC at 19.3°N 128.6°E – The JTWC reports that Tropical Storm Lekima (10W) has intensified into a Category 1-equivalent typhoon on the SSHWS.

==== August 7 ====
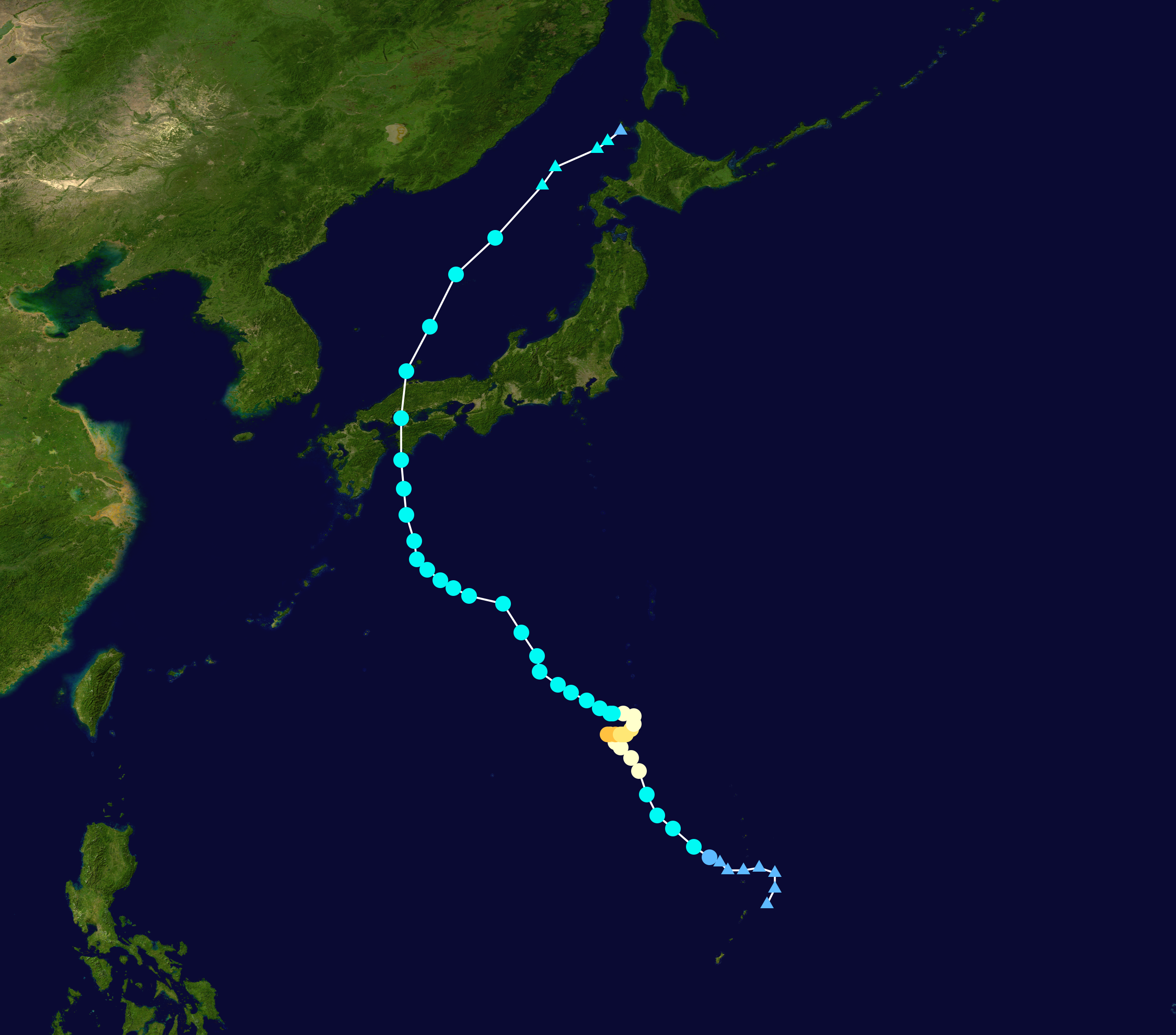
Storm path of Typhoon Krosa

- 00:00 UTC at 37.9°N 129.0°E – The JMA reports that Tropical Storm Francisco (09W) has weakened into a tropical depression.
- 00:00 UTC at 38.1°N 128.7°E – The JTWC reports that Tropical Storm Francisco (09W) has weakened into a tropical depression.
- 00:00 UTC at 20.5°N 141.9°E – The JMA reports that Tropical Storm Krosa (11W) has intensified into a severe tropical storm.
- 00:00 UTC at 20.6°N 141.7°E – The JTWC reports that Tropical Storm Krosa (11W) has intensified into a Category 1-equivalent typhoon on the SSHWS.
- 06:00 UTC at 21.0°N 127.7°E – The JTWC reports that Typhoon Lekima (10W) has intensified into a Category 2-equivalent typhoon on the SSHWS.
- 12:00 UTC at 40.0°N 130.0°E – The JTWC reports that Tropical Depression Francisco (09W) has transitioned into an extratropical cyclone.
- 12:00 UTC at 21.6°N 127.0°E – The JMA reports that Typhoon Lekima (10W) has intensified into a very strong typhoon.
- 12:00 UTC at 21.6°N 127.0°E – The JTWC reports that Typhoon Lekima (10W) has intensified into a Category 4-equivalent typhoon on the SSHWS.
- 18:00 UTC at 21.7°N 140.8°E – The JMA reports that Severe Tropical Storm Krosa (11W) has intensified into a typhoon.

==== August 8 ====
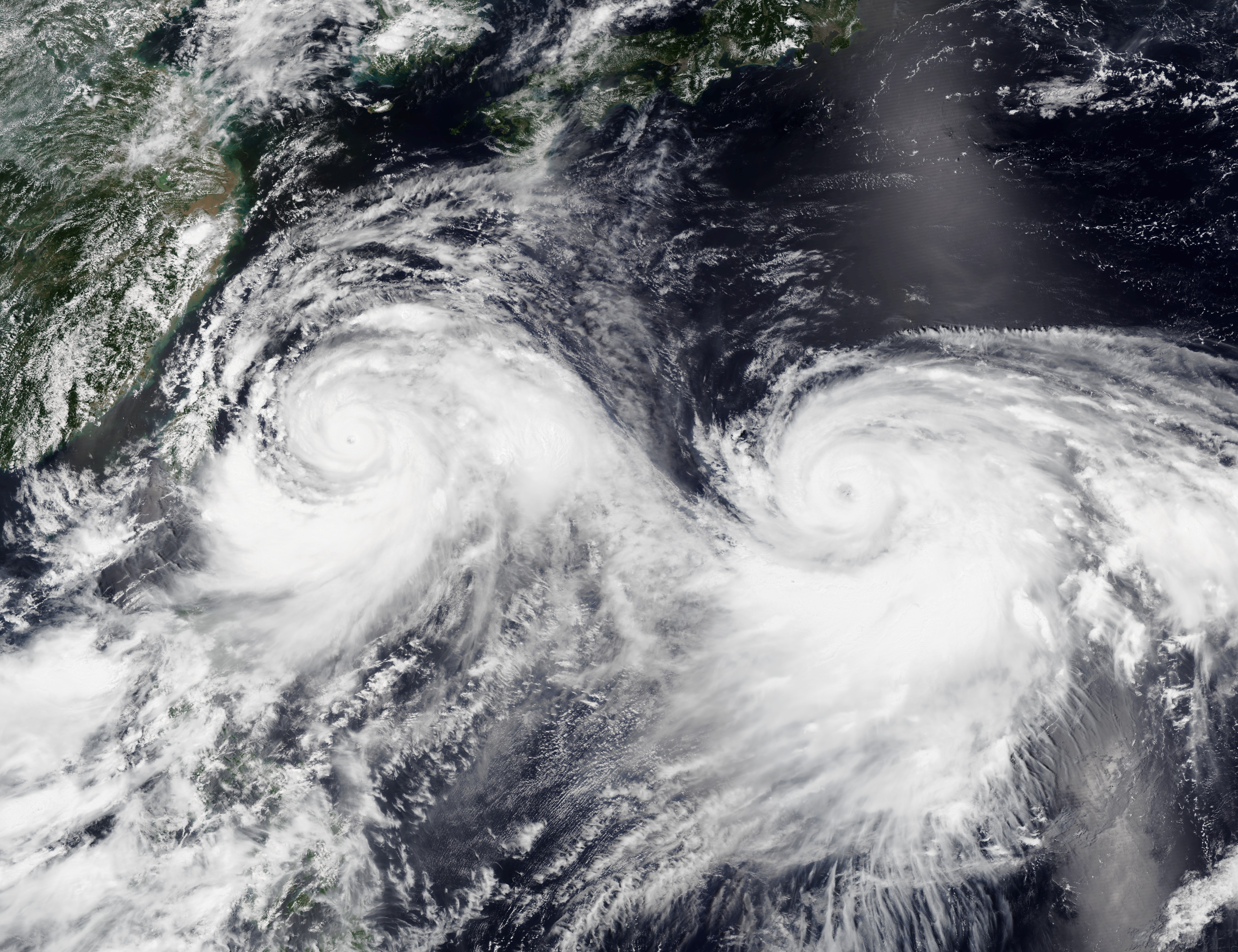
Satellite image of Typhoons Lekima (left) and Krosa (right) on August 8

- 00:00 UTC at 22.0°N 140.6°E – The JTWC reports that Typhoon Krosa (11W) has intensified into a Category 2-equivalent typhoon on the SSHWS.
- 00:00 UTC at 16.0°N 119.0°E – The JMA reports that a fourth tropical depression has formed.
- 06:00 UTC at 23.7°N 125.4°E – The JTWC reports that Typhoon Lekima (10W) has intensified into a super typhoon.
- 06:00 UTC at 18.2°N 129.8°E – The JMA reports that Typhoon Krosa (11W) has reached its peak intensity, estimating maximum sustained winds of 140 km/h (85 mph) and a minimum barometric pressure of 965 hPa (28.50 inHg).
- 06:00 UTC at 22.0°N 140.5°E – The JTWC reports that Typhoon Krosa (11W) has reached its peak winds as a Category 3-equivalent typhoon on the SSHWS, estimating maximum sustained winds of 185 km/h (115 mph).
- 06:00 UTC at 17.0°N 119.0°E – The JMA last notes the fourth tropical depression.
- 12:00 UTC at 24.3°N 125.0°E – The JMA reports that Typhoon Lekima (10W) has reached its peak intensity as a violent typhoon, estimating maximum sustained winds of 195 km/h (120 mph) and a minimum barometric pressure of 925 hPa (27.32 inHg).
- 12:00 UTC at 24.4°N 124.9°E – The JTWC reports that Super Typhoon Lekima (10W) has reached its peak winds, estimating maximum 1-minute sustained winds of 250 km/h (155 mph).
- 12:00 UTC at 22.0°N 140.8°E – The JTWC reports that Typhoon Krosa (11W) has reached a minimum barometric pressure of 945 hPa (27.91 inHg).
- 16:00 UTC – The PAGASA reports that Typhoon Lekima (10W) has exited the PAR.
- 18:00 UTC at 43.0°N 139.5°E – The JMA reports that Tropical Depression Francisco (09W) has transitioned into an extratropical cyclone.
- 18:00 UTC at 25.5°N 124.5°E – The JMA reports that Typhoon Lekima (10W) has weakened from a violent typhoon into a very strong typhoon.
- 18:00 UTC at 25.4°N 124.5°E – The JTWC reports that Super Typhoon Lekima (10W) has reached a minimum barometric pressure of 904 hPa (26.70 inHg).
- 18:00 UTC at 22.0°N 141.0°E – The JTWC reports that Typhoon Krosa (11W) has weakened into a Category 2-equivalent typhoon on the SSHWS.

==== August 9 ====
- 00:00 UTC at 26.4°N 123.4°E – The JTWC reports that Super Typhoon Lekima (10W) has weakened into a typhoon.
- 06:00 UTC at 27.0°N 122.5°E – The JTWC reports that Typhoon Lekima (10W) has weakened into a Category 3-equivalent typhoon on the SSHWS.
- 17:45 UTC – Lekima (10W) makes its first landfall near Wenling, Zhejiang, China.
- 18:00 UTC at 28.4°N 121.4°E – The JTWC reports that Typhoon Lekima (10W) has weakened into a Category 2-equivalent typhoon on the SSHWS.
- 18:00 UTC at 22.4°N 141.5°E – The JTWC reports that Typhoon Krosa (11W) has weakened into a Category 1-equivalent typhoon on the SSHWS.

==== August 10 ====
- 00:00 UTC at 29.1°N 120.7°E – The JMA reports that Typhoon Lekima (10W) has weakened from a very strong typhoon into a severe tropical storm, skipping typhoon status.
- 00:00 UTC at 29.2°N 120.9°E – The JTWC reports that Typhoon Lekima (10W) has weakened into a Category 1-equivalent typhoon on the SSHWS.
- 06:00 UTC at 30.1°N 120.5°E – The JTWC reports that Typhoon Lekima (10W) has weakened into a tropical storm.
- 12:00 UTC at 30.8°N 120.4°E – The JMA reports that Severe Tropical Storm Lekima (10W) has weakened into a tropical storm.
- 12:00 UTC at 22.8°N 140.7°E – The JTWC reports that Typhoon Krosa (11W) has weakened into a tropical storm.

==== August 11 ====
- 12:00 UTC – Lekima (10W) makes its second and final landfall in Qingdao, Shandong, China.
- 12:00 UTC at 24.0°N 139.2°E – The JMA reports that Typhoon Krosa (11W) has weakened into a severe tropical storm.
- 18:00 UTC at 37.5°N 120.2°E – The JTWC reports that Tropical Storm Lekima (10W) has transitioned into a subtropical storm.

==== August 12 ====
- 18:00 UTC at 37.0°N 120.0°E – The JMA reports that Tropical Storm Lekima (10W) has weakened into a tropical depression.

==== August 13 ====
- 18:00 UTC at 28.3°N 133.5°E – The JMA reports that Severe Tropical Storm Krosa (11W) has again reached a minimum barometric pressure of 965 hPa (28.50 inHg).

==== August 14 ====
- 00:00 UTC at 38.8°N 121.4°E – The JMA reports that Tropical Depression Lekima (10W) has transitioned into an extratropical cyclone.

==== August 15 ====
- 06:00 UTC at 34.3°N 132.6°E – The JMA reports that Severe Tropical Storm Krosa (11W) has weakened into a tropical storm.
- 06:00 UTC – Krosa (11W) makes landfall over Kure, Hiroshima Prefecture, Japan.
- 18:00 UTC at 37.6°N 133.7°E – The JTWC reports that Tropical Storm Krosa (11W) has transitioned into an extratropical cyclone.

==== August 16 ====
- 12:00 UTC at 43.0°N 138.0°E – The JMA reports that Tropical Storm Krosa (11W) has transitioned into an extratropical cyclone.

==== August 17 ====
- 06:00 UTC at 22.0°N 155.0°E – The JMA reports that a fifth tropical depression has formed.

==== August 18 ====
- 12:00 UTC at 24.0°N 150.0°E – The JMA last notes the fifth tropical depression.

==== August 19 ====
- 06:00 UTC at 24.0°N 124.0°E – The JMA reports that a sixth tropical depression has formed.
- 12:00 UTC at 13.0°N 134.0°E – The JMA reports that a seventh tropical depression has formed.
- 18:00 UTC at 13.2°N 133.9°E – The PAGASA reports that the seventh tropical depression has formed within the PAR, assigning it the local name Ineng.

==== August 21 ====
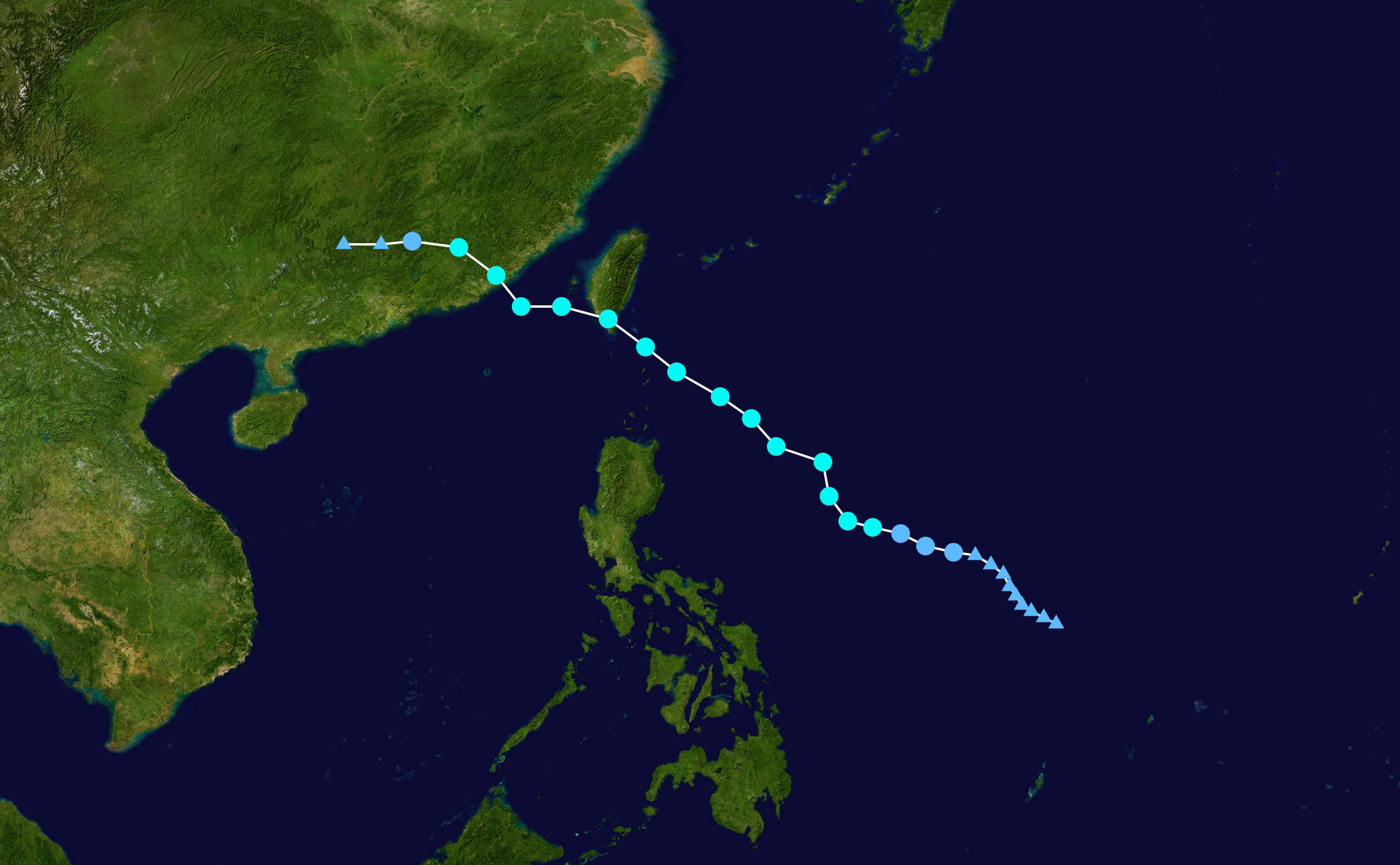
Storm path of Severe Tropical Storm Bailu (Ineng)

- 06:00 UTC at 31.0°N 123.0°E – The JMA last notes the sixth tropical depression.
- 06:00 UTC at 14.6°N 131.3°E – The JMA reports that Tropical Depression Ineng has intensified into a tropical storm, assigning it the name Bailu.
- 06:00 UTC at 14.9°N 131.8°E – The JTWC begins tracking Tropical Depression Bailu, designating it 12W.

==== August 22 ====
- 00:00 UTC at 15.7°N 129.2°E – The JTWC reports that Tropical Depression Bailu (12W) has intensified into a tropical storm.
- 18:00 UTC at 17.2°N 127.3°E – The JMA reports that Tropical Storm Bailu (12W) has reached its peak intensity as a severe tropical storm, estimating maximum sustained winds of 95 km/h (60 mph) and a minimum barometric pressure of 985 hPa (29.09 inHg).

==== August 24 ====
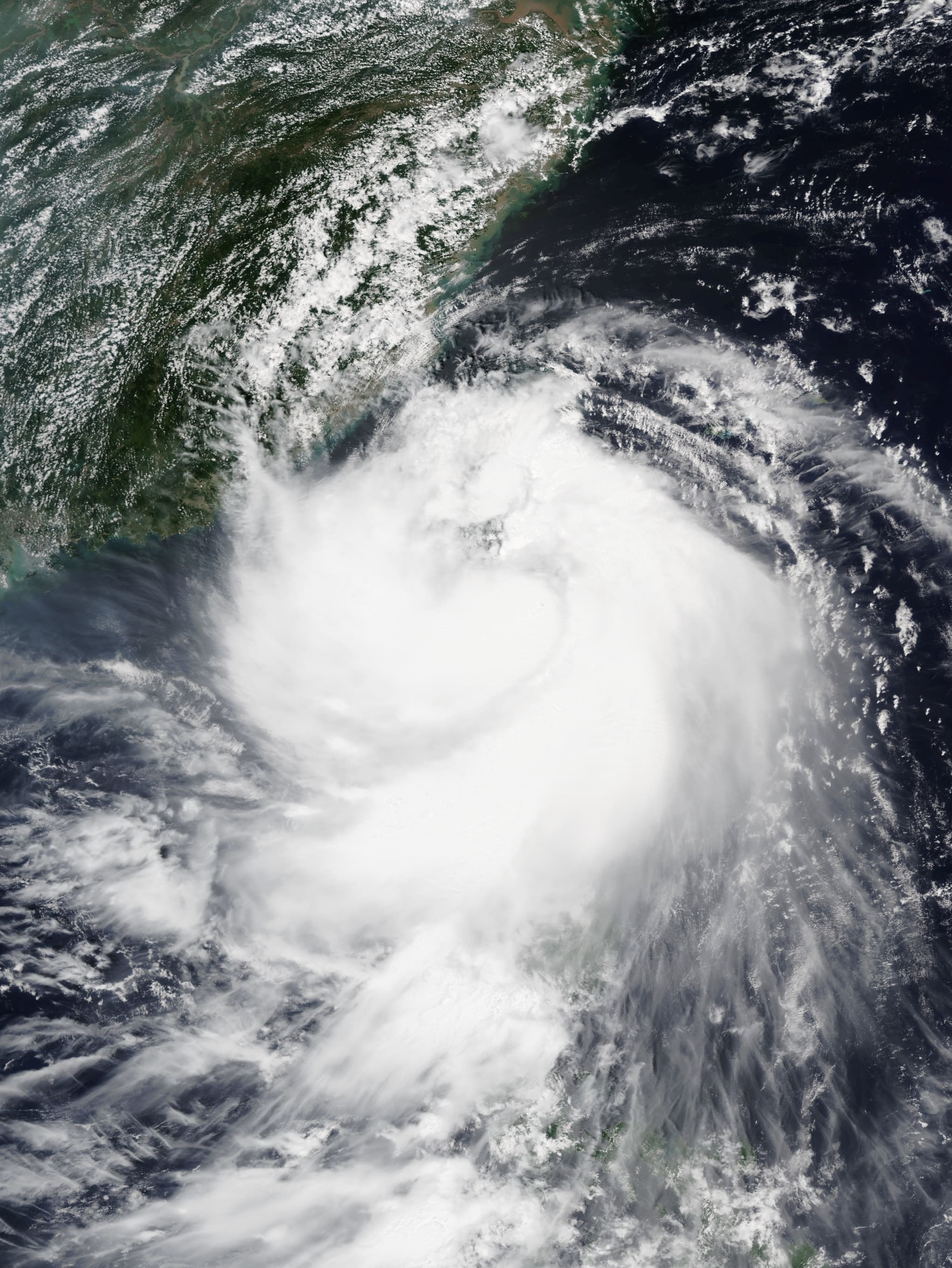
Satellite image of Severe Tropical Storm Bailu near Taiwan on August 24

- 06:00 UTC at 22.4°N 120.7°E – The JTWC reports that Tropical Storm Bailu (12W) has reached its peak intensity, estimating maximum 1-minute sustained winds of 110 km/h (70 mph) and a minimum pressure of 979 hPa (28.91 inHg).
- 06:00 UTC at 8.4°N 142.5°E – The JMA reports that an eighth tropical depression has formed.
- 10:00 UTC – The PAGASA reports that Severe Tropical Storm Bailu (12W) has exited the PAR.
- 15:00 UTC – Bailu (12W) makes its first landfall in the southern portion of Pingtung County, Taiwan.
- 18:00 UTC at 22.7°N 118.0°E – The JMA reports that Severe Tropical Storm Bailu (12W) has weakened into a tropical storm.

==== August 25 ====
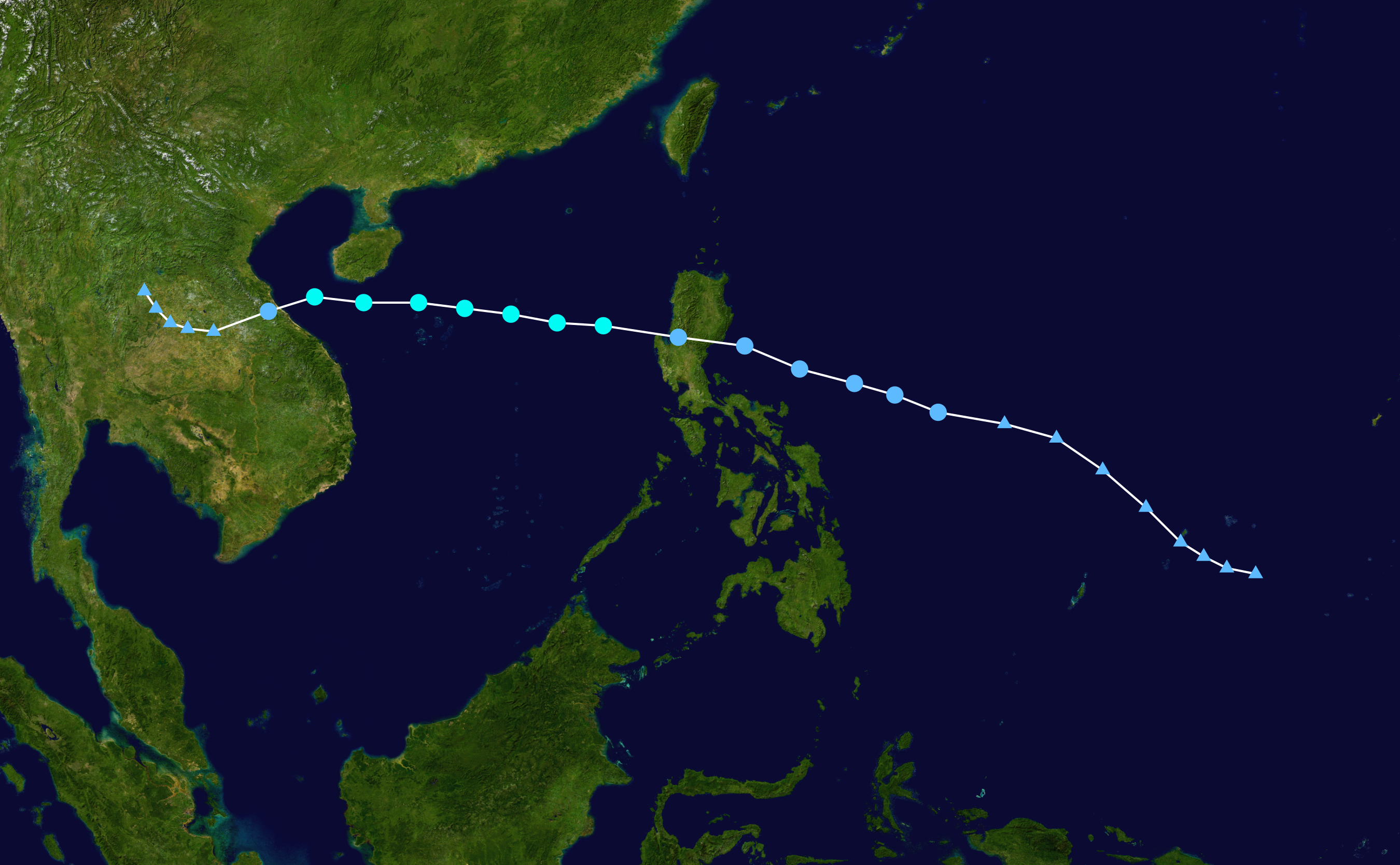
Storm path of Tropical Storm Podul (Jenny)

- 05:35 UTC – Bailu (12W) makes its second and final landfall near Dongshan County, Fujian, China.
- 12:00 UTC at 24.9°N 114.4°E – The JTWC reports that Tropical Storm Bailu (12W) has weakened into a tropical depression.
- 14:00 UTC – The PAGASA reports that the eighth tropical depression has entered the PAR, assigning it the local name Jenny.
- 18:00 UTC at 24.8°N 113.0°E – The JMA reports that Tropical Storm Bailu (12W) has weakened into a tropical depression.
- 18:00 UTC at 24.8°N 113.4°E – The JTWC reports that Tropical Depression Bailu (12W) has weakened into a tropical disturbance.

==== August 26 ====
- 06:00 UTC at 25.7°N 111.1°E – The JMA last notes Tropical Depression Bailu (12W); it dissipates six hours later.
- 12:00 UTC at 13.7°N 129.6°E – The JTWC begins tracking Tropical Depression Jenny, designating it 13W.

==== August 27 ====
- 13:00 UTC – 13W (Jenny) makes its first landfall near Dipaculao, Aurora in the Philippines.

==== August 28 ====
- 00:00 UTC at 16.5°N 117.3°E – The JMA reports that Tropical Depression 13W (Jenny) has intensified into a tropical storm, assigning it the name Podul.
- 00:00 UTC at 16.7°N 118.0°E – The JTWC reports that Tropical Depression Podul (13W) has intensified into a tropical storm.
- 06:00 UTC at 16.6°N 116.0°E – The JMA reports that Tropical Storm Podul (13W) has reached its peak winds, estimating maximum sustained winds of 75 km/h (45 mph).
- 06:00 UTC – The PAGASA reports that Tropical Storm Podul (13W) has exited the PAR.

==== August 29 ====
- 00:00 UTC at 17.5°N 111.6°E – The JTWC reports that Tropical Storm Podul (13W) has reached its peak intensity, estimating maximum 1-minute sustained winds of 75 km/h (45 mph).
- 06:00 UTC at 17.5°N 109.1°E – The JMA reports that Tropical Storm Podul (13W) has reached a minimum barometric pressure of 992 hPa (29.29 inHg).
- 06:00 UTC at 17.5°N 109.7°E – The JTWC reports that Tropical Storm Podul (13W) has reached a minimum barometric pressure of 993 hPa (29.32 inHg).
- 17:00–18:00 UTC – Podul (13W) makes its second and final landfall near Hà Tĩnh Province, Vietnam.
- 18:00 UTC at 17.2°N 106.4°E – The JTWC reports that Tropical Storm Podul (13W) has weakened into a tropical depression.

==== August 30 ====
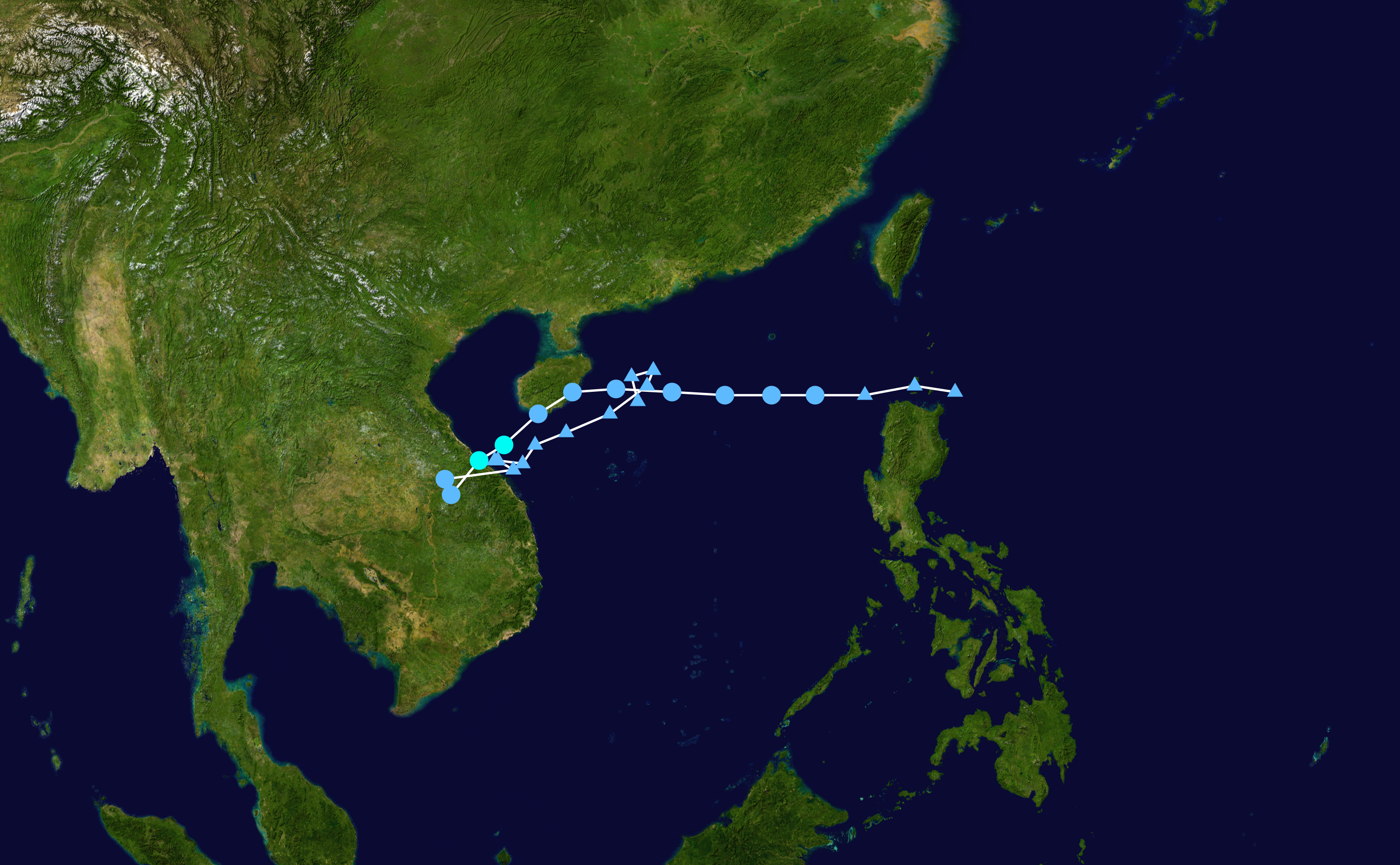
Storm path of Tropical Storm Kajiki (Kabayan)

- 00:00 UTC at 16.8°N 105.1°E – The JMA reports that Tropical Storm Podul (13W) has weakened into a tropical depression.
- 00:00 UTC at 16.5°N 104.5°E – The JTWC reports that Tropical Depression Podul (13W) has weakened into a tropical disturbance.
- 00:00 UTC at 18.2°N 126.3°E – The JMA reports that a ninth tropical depression has formed.

==== August 31 ====
- 00:00 UTC at 17.9°N 102.1°E – The JMA last notes Tropical Depression Podul (13W); it dissipates six hours later.
- 00:00 UTC at 6.2°N 133.7°E – The JMA reports that a tenth tropical depression has formed.
- 06:00 UTC at 19.1°N 121.4°E – The PAGASA reports that the ninth tropical depression has formed within the PAR, assigning it the local name Kabayan.
- 18:00 UTC at 18.8°N 118.2°E – The JTWC begins tracking Tropical Depression Kabayan, designating it 16W.
- 19:00 UTC – The PAGASA reports that Tropical Depression 16W (Kabayan) has exited the PAR.

=== September ===
==== September 1 ====
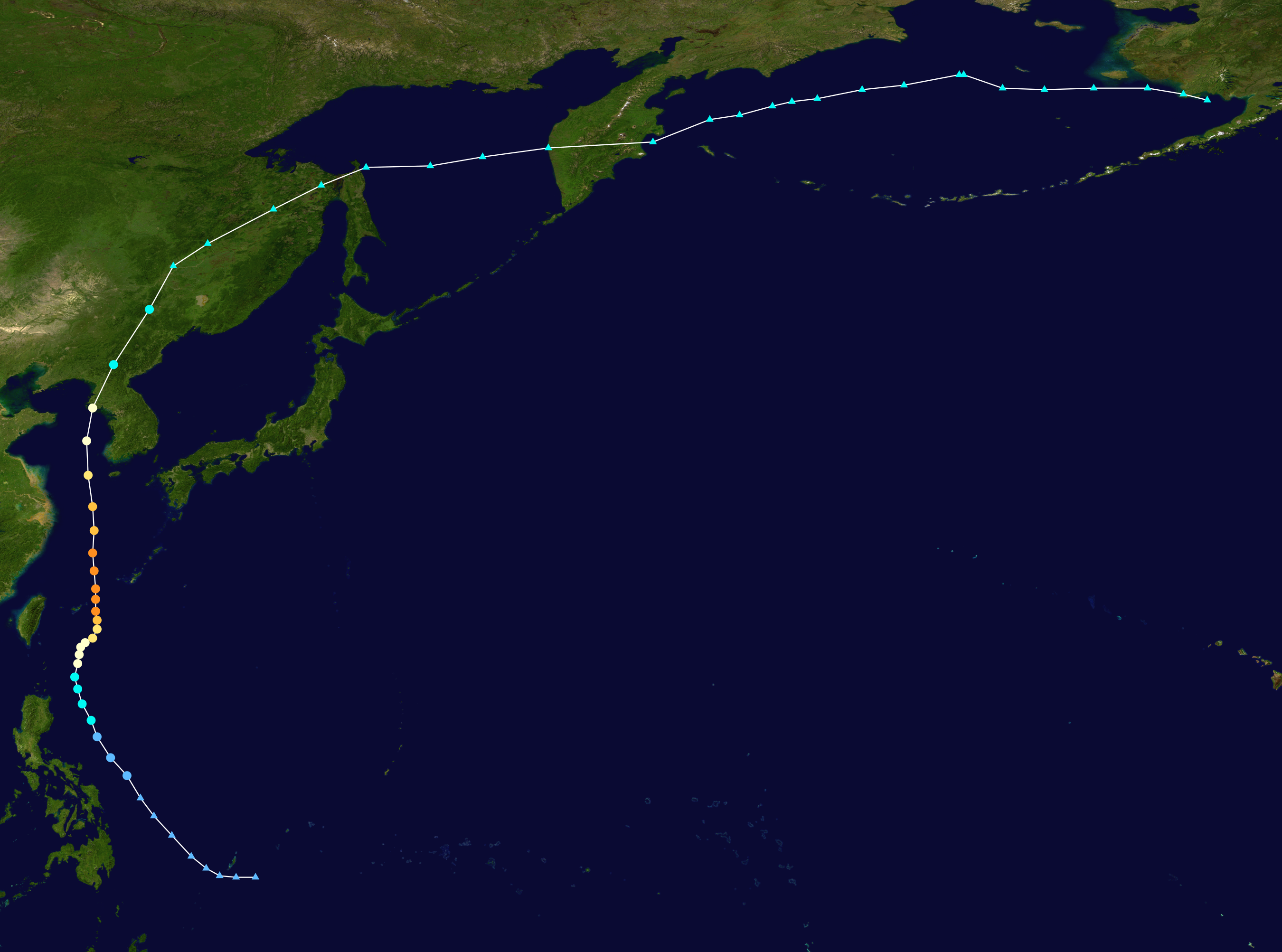
Storm path of Typhoon Lingling (Liwayway)

- 00:00 UTC at 11.0°N 129.2°E – The PAGASA reports that the tenth tropical depression of August has formed within the PAR, assigning it the local name Liwayway.
- 06:00 UTC at 15.3°N 171.4°E – The JTWC reports that the first tropical depression of the month has formed, designating it 14W.
- 12:00 UTC at 13.2°N 127.4°E – The JTWC begins tracking Tropical Depression Liwayway, designating it 15W.
- 18:00 UTC at 15.0°N 116.0°E – The JMA reports that a second tropical depression has formed.

==== September 2 ====
- 00:00 UTC at 15.2°N 126.1°E – The JMA reports that Tropical Depression 15W (Liwayway) has intensified into a tropical storm, assigning it the name Lingling.
- 00:00 UTC at 15.9°N 167.9°E – The JMA begins tracking Tropical Depression 14W.
- 00:00 UTC – 16W makes its first landfall near Wanning City, Hainan, China.
- 06:00 UTC at 16.9°N 125.0°E – The JTWC reports that Tropical Depression Lingling (15W) has intensified into a tropical storm.
- 12:00 UTC at 17.2°N 108.4°E – The JMA reports that Tropical Depression 16W has reached its peak intensity as a tropical storm, assigning it the name Kajiki and estimating maximum sustained winds of 65 km/h (40 mph) and a minimum barometric pressure of 996 hPa (29.41 inHg).
- 12:00 UTC at 17.2°N 108.2°E – The JTWC reports that Tropical Depression Kajiki (16W) has reached its peak winds as a tropical storm, estimating maximum 1-minute sustained winds of 65 km/h (40 mph).
- 17:00 UTC – Kajiki (16W) makes its second and final landfall near Thừa Thiên Huế Province, Vietnam.
- 18:00 UTC at 16.8°N 163.8°E – The JTWC reports that Tropical Depression 14W has intensified into a tropical storm.
- 18:00 UTC at 16.7°N 107.4°E – The JTWC reports that Tropical Storm Kajiki (16W) has reached a minimum barometric pressure of 993 hPa (29.32 inHg).
- 18:00 UTC at 16.6°N 114.5°E – The JMA last notes the second tropical depression, estimating maximum sustained winds of 55 km/h (35 mph) and a minimum barometric pressure of 998 hPa (29.47 inHg).

==== September 3 ====
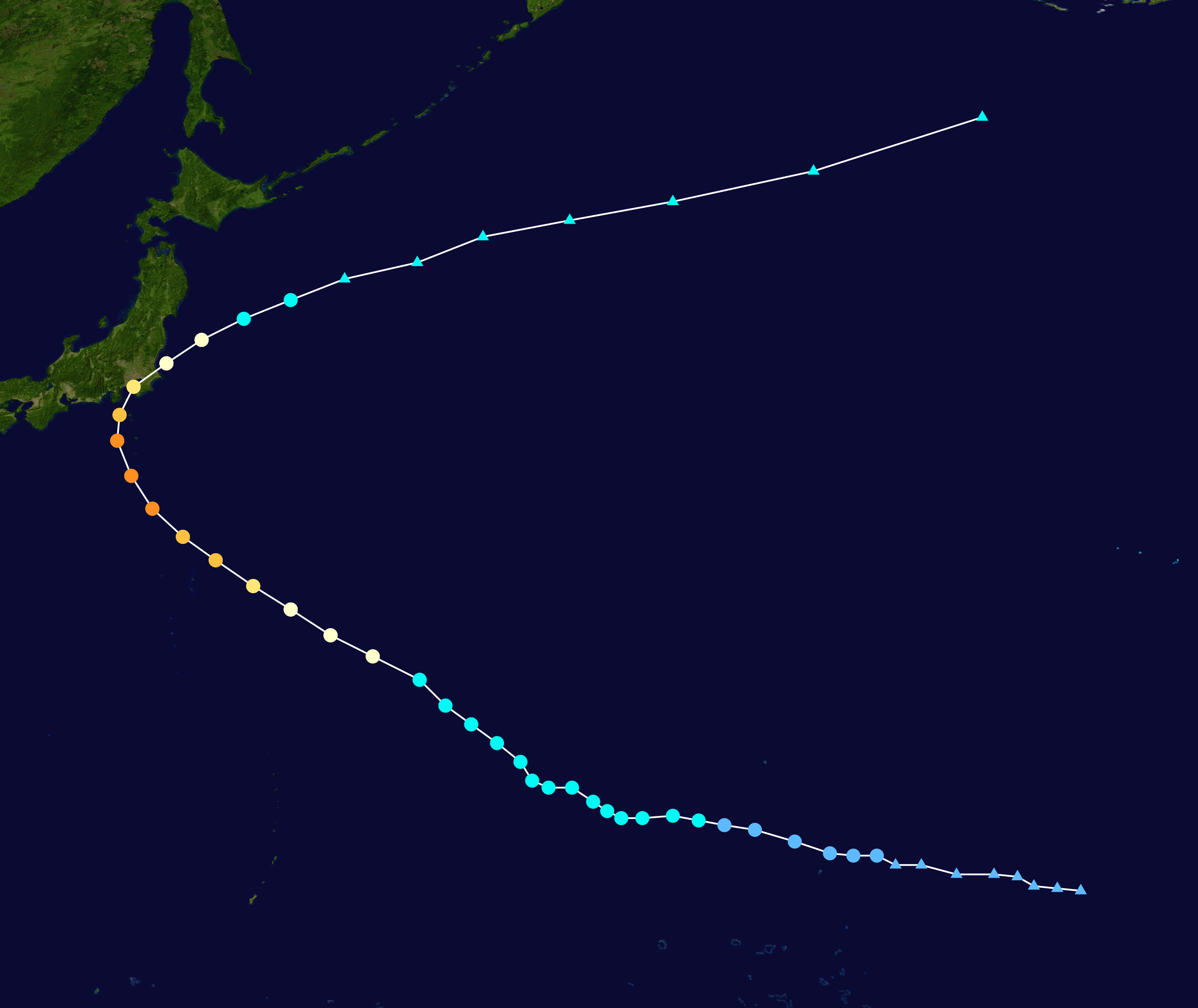
Storm path of Typhoon Faxai

- 00:00 UTC at 15.6°N 106.5°E – The JTWC reports that Tropical Storm Kajiki (16W) has weakened into a tropical depression.
- 00:00 UTC at 19.7°N 123.9°E – The JMA reports that Tropical Storm Lingling (15W) has intensified into a severe tropical storm.
- 06:00 UTC at 16.1°N 106.3°E – The JTWC last notes Tropical Depression Kajiki (16W).
- 06:00 UTC at 20.7°N 124.1°E – The JTWC reports that Tropical Storm Lingling (15W) has intensified into a Category 1-equivalent typhoon on the SSHWS.
- 12:00 UTC at 16.4°N 108.5°E – The JMA reports that Tropical Storm Kajiki (16W) has weakened into a tropical depression.
- 18:00 UTC at 21.7°N 124.4°E – The JMA reports that Severe Tropical Storm Lingling (15W) has intensified into a typhoon.

==== September 4 ====
- 00:00 UTC at 11.0°N 136.0°E – The JMA reports that a third tropical depression has formed.
- 06:00 UTC at 22.4°N 125.1°E – The JTWC reports that Typhoon Lingling (15W) has intensified into a Category 2-equivalent typhoon on the SSHWS.
- 06:00 UTC at 11.0°N 135.0°E – The JMA reports that the third tropical depression has reached a minimum barometric pressure of 1,006 hPa (29.71 inHg).
- 18:00 UTC at 23.5°N 125.4°E – The JMA reports that Typhoon Lingling (15W) has intensified into a very strong typhoon.
- 18:00 UTC at 23.6°N 125.4°E – The JTWC reports that Typhoon Lingling (15W) has intensified into a Category 3-equivalent typhoon on the SSHWS.
- 18:00 UTC at 18.6°N 156.7°E – The JMA reports that Tropical Depression 14W has intensified into a tropical storm, assigning it the name Faxai.

==== September 5 ====
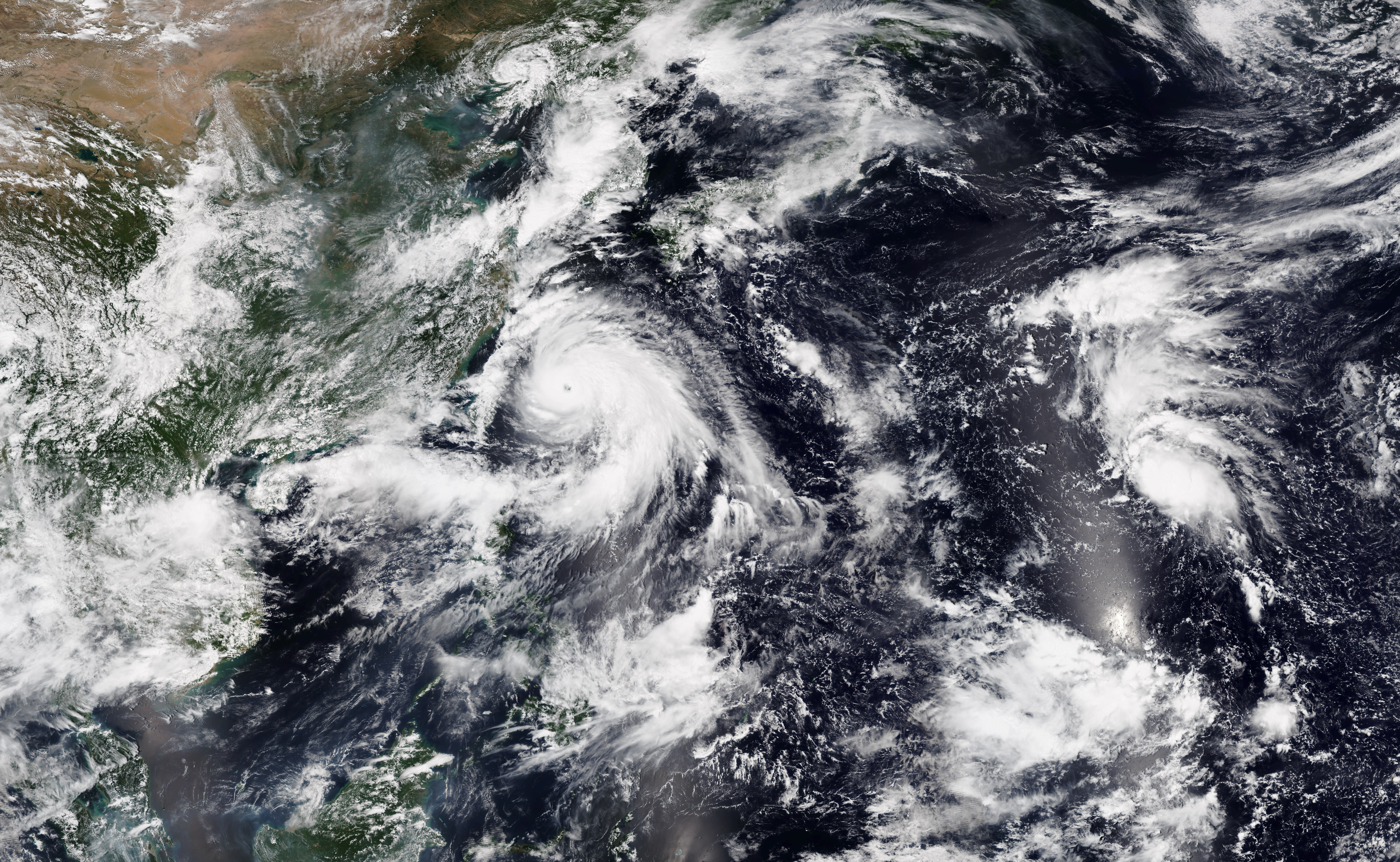
Satellite image of Tropical Depression Kajiki (left), Typhoon Lingling (center), and Tropical Storm Faxai (right) on September 5

- 00:00 UTC at 24.2°N 125.3°E – The JTWC reports that Typhoon Lingling (15W) has intensified into a Category 4-equivalent typhoon on the SSHWS.
- 06:00 UTC at 24.9°N 125.3°E – The JMA reports that Typhoon Lingling (15W) has reached its peak intensity, estimating maximum sustained winds of 175 km/h (110 mph) and a minimum barometric pressure of 940 hPa (27.76 inHg).
- 06:00 UTC at 13.0°N 135.0°E – The JMA last notes the third tropical depression.
- 08:00 UTC – The PAGASA reports that Typhoon Lingling (15W) has exited the PAR.
- 12:00 UTC at 25.7°N 125.3°E – The JTWC reports that Typhoon Lingling (15W) has reached its peak winds, estimating maximum 1-minute sustained winds of 220 km/h (140 mph).
- 14:05 UTC – Lingling (15W) makes its first landfall over Miyako Island, Ryukyu Islands, Japan.
- 18:00 UTC at 26.9°N 125.2°E – The JTWC reports that Typhoon Lingling (15W) has reached a minimum barometric pressure of 928 hPa (27.40 inHg).

==== September 6 ====
- 06:00 UTC at 18.6°N 112.5°E – The JMA last notes Tropical Depression Kajiki (16W); it dissipates six hours later.
- 06:00 UTC at 29.6°N 125.2°E – The JMA reports that Typhoon Lingling (15W) has weakened from a very strong typhoon into a typhoon.
- 06:00 UTC at 29.6°N 125.2°E – The JTWC reports that Typhoon Lingling (15W) has weakened into a Category 3-equivalent typhoon on the SSHWS.
- 06:00 UTC at 23.7°N 149.9°E – The JMA reports that Tropical Storm Faxai (14W) has intensified into a severe tropical storm.
- 06:00 UTC at 23.8°N 149.9°E – The JTWC reports that Tropical Storm Faxai (14W) has intensified into a Category 1-equivalent typhoon on the SSHWS.
- 18:00 UTC at 33.3°N 124.8°E – The JTWC reports that Typhoon Lingling (15W) has weakened into a Category 2-equivalent typhoon on the SSHWS.

==== September 7 ====
- 00:00 UTC at 35.6°N 124.7°E – The JTWC reports that Typhoon Lingling (15W) has weakened into a Category 1-equivalent typhoon on the SSHWS.
- 00:00 UTC at 26.7°N 145.0°E – The JMA reports that Severe Tropical Storm Faxai (14W) has intensified into a typhoon.
- 00:00 UTC at 26.8°N 144.8°E – The JTWC reports that Typhoon Faxai (14W) has intensified into a Category 2-equivalent typhoon on the SSHWS.
- 00:00 UTC at 25.0°N 124.0°E – The JMA reports that a fourth tropical depression has formed.
- 05:30 UTC – Lingling (15W) makes its second and final landfall near Kangryong County, South Hwanghae Province, North Korea.
- 06:00 UTC at 37.9°N 125.2°E – The JMA reports that Typhoon Lingling (15W) has weakened into a severe tropical storm.
- 06:00 UTC at 27.9°N 143.2°E – The JTWC reports that Typhoon Faxai (14W) has intensified into a Category 3-equivalent typhoon on the SSHWS.
- 12:00 UTC at 40.7°N 126.5°E – The JTWC reports that Typhoon Lingling (15W) has weakened into a tropical storm.
- 18:00 UTC at 44.4°N 128.5°E – The JMA reports that Severe Tropical Storm Lingling (15W) has weakened into a tropical storm.
- 18:00 UTC at 44.4°N 128.9°E – The JTWC reports that Tropical Storm Lingling (15W) has transitioned into an extratropical cyclone.
- 18:00 UTC at 30.2°N 140.5°E – The JMA reports that Typhoon Faxai (14W) has reached its peak intensity as a very strong typhoon, estimating maximum sustained winds of 155 km/h (100 mph) and a minimum barometric pressure of 955 hPa (28.20 inHg).
- 18:00 UTC at 30.1°N 140.5°E – The JTWC reports that Typhoon Faxai (14W) has reached its peak winds as a Category 4-equivalent typhoon on the SSHWS, estimating maximum 1-minute sustained winds of 215 km/h (130 mph).

==== September 8 ====
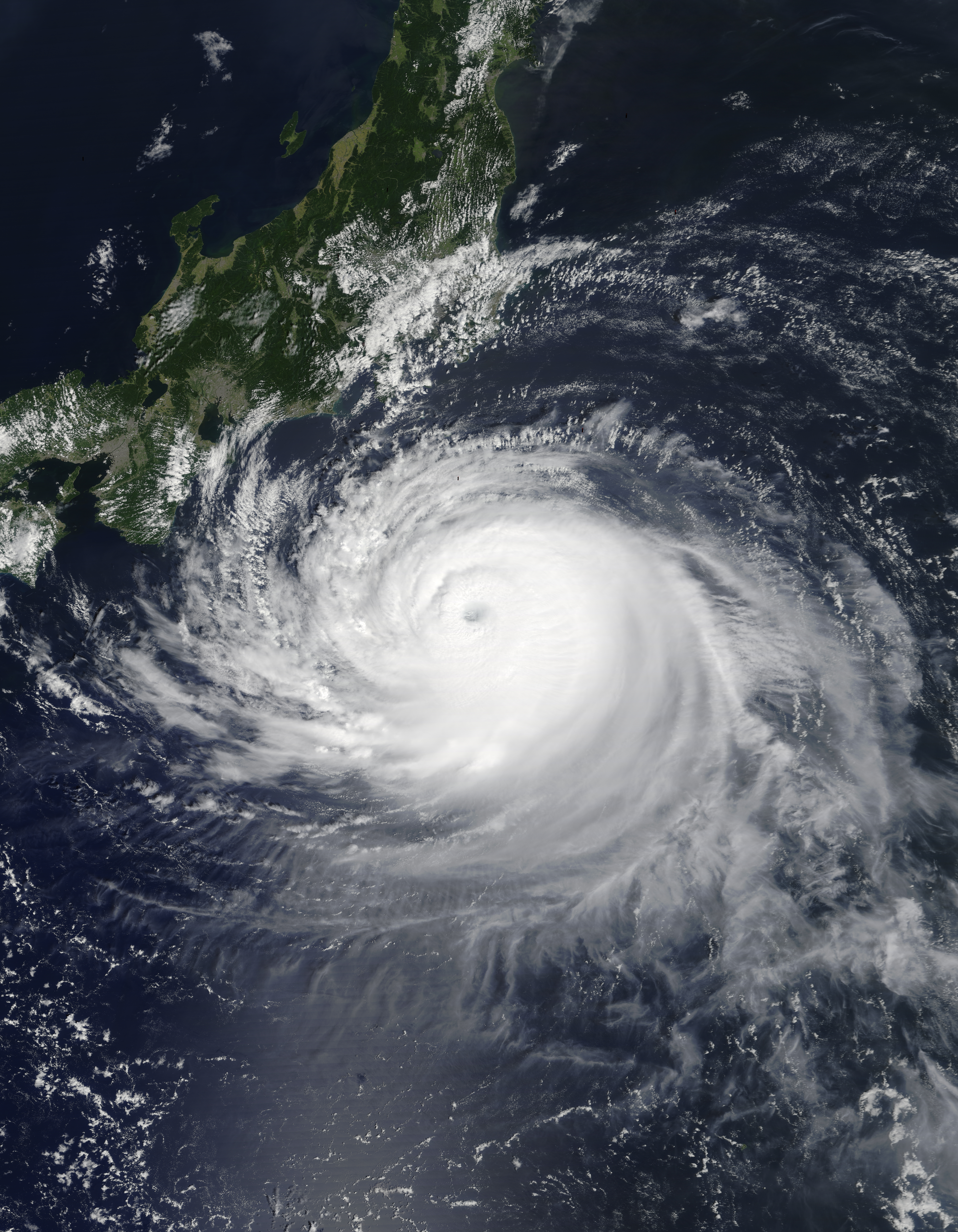
Satellite image of Typhoon Faxai shortly after reaching its peak intensity, while approaching Japan on September 8

- 00:00 UTC at 47.3°N 130.5°E – The JMA reports that Tropical Storm Lingling (15W) has transitioned into an extratropical cyclone.
- 06:00 UTC at 33.0°N 139.0°E – The JTWC reports that Typhoon Faxai (14W) has reached a minimum barometric pressure of 940 hPa (27.76 inHg).
- 06:00 UTC at 29.5°N 124.9°E – The JMA reports that the fourth tropical depression has reached its peak intensity, estimating maximum sustained winds of 55 km/h (35 mph) and a minimum barometric pressure of 1,000 hPa (29.53 inHg).
- 12:00 UTC at 34.1°N 139.1°E – The JTWC reports that Typhoon Faxai (14W) has weakened into a Category 3-equivalent typhoon on the SSHWS.
- 15:00 UTC at 34.7°N 139.3°E – The JMA reports that Typhoon Faxai (14W) has weakened from a very strong typhoon into a typhoon.
- <18:00 UTC – Faxai (15W) makes its first landfall on the Miura Peninsula.
- 18:00 UTC at 35.3°N 139.7°E – The JTWC reports that Typhoon Faxai (14W) has weakened into a Category 2-equivalent typhoon on the SSHWS.
- <20:00 UTC – Faxai (15W) makes its second and final landfall near Chiba City, Chiba Prefecture.

==== September 9 ====
- 00:00 UTC at 36.3°N 141.1°E – The JTWC reports that Typhoon Faxai (14W) has weakened into a Category 1-equivalent typhoon on the SSHWS.
- 12:00 UTC at 38.3°N 144.3°E – The JMA reports that Typhoon Faxai (14W) has weakened into a severe tropical storm.
- 12:00 UTC at 38.2°N 144.4°E – The JTWC reports that Typhoon Faxai (14W) has weakened into a tropical storm.

==== September 10 ====
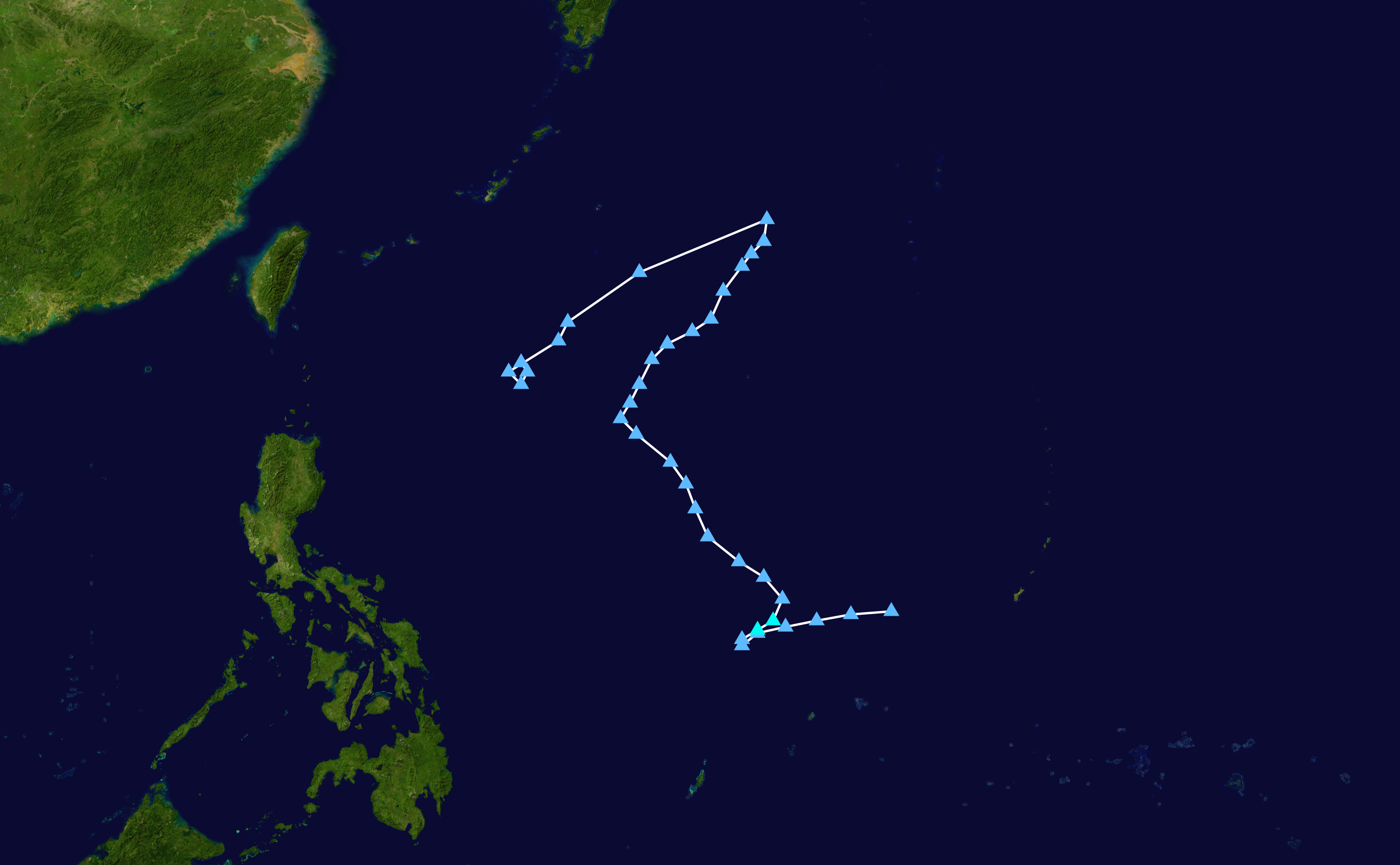
Storm path of Tropical Depression Marilyn

- 00:00 UTC at 39.7°N 148.8°E – The JMA reports that Severe Tropical Storm Faxai (14W) has transitioned into an extratropical cyclone.
- 00:00 UTC at 39.9°N 148.7°E – The JTWC reports that Tropical Storm Faxai (14W) has transitioned into an extratropical cyclone.
- 06:00 UTC at 36.0°N 124.0°E – The JMA last notes the fourth tropical depression.
- 06:00 UTC at 12.0°N 135.9°E – The JMA reports that a fifth tropical depression has formed, estimating maximum sustained winds of 55 km/h (35 mph).

==== September 12 ====
- 00:00 UTC at 16.2°N 134.4°E – The PAGASA reports that the fifth system, assessed as a monsoon depression, has intensified into a tropical depression within the PAR, assigning it the local name Marilyn.
- 12:00 UTC at 11.7°N 159.2°E – The JMA reports that a sixth tropical depression has formed.

==== September 13 ====
- 06:00 UTC at 19.5°N 132.8°E – The JMA last notes Tropical Depression Marilyn, estimating a minimum barometric pressure of 996 hPa (29.41 inHg).

==== September 14 ====
- 12:00 UTC at 14.3°N 151.1°E – The JTWC begins tracking the sixth tropical depression, designating it 17W.

==== September 15 ====
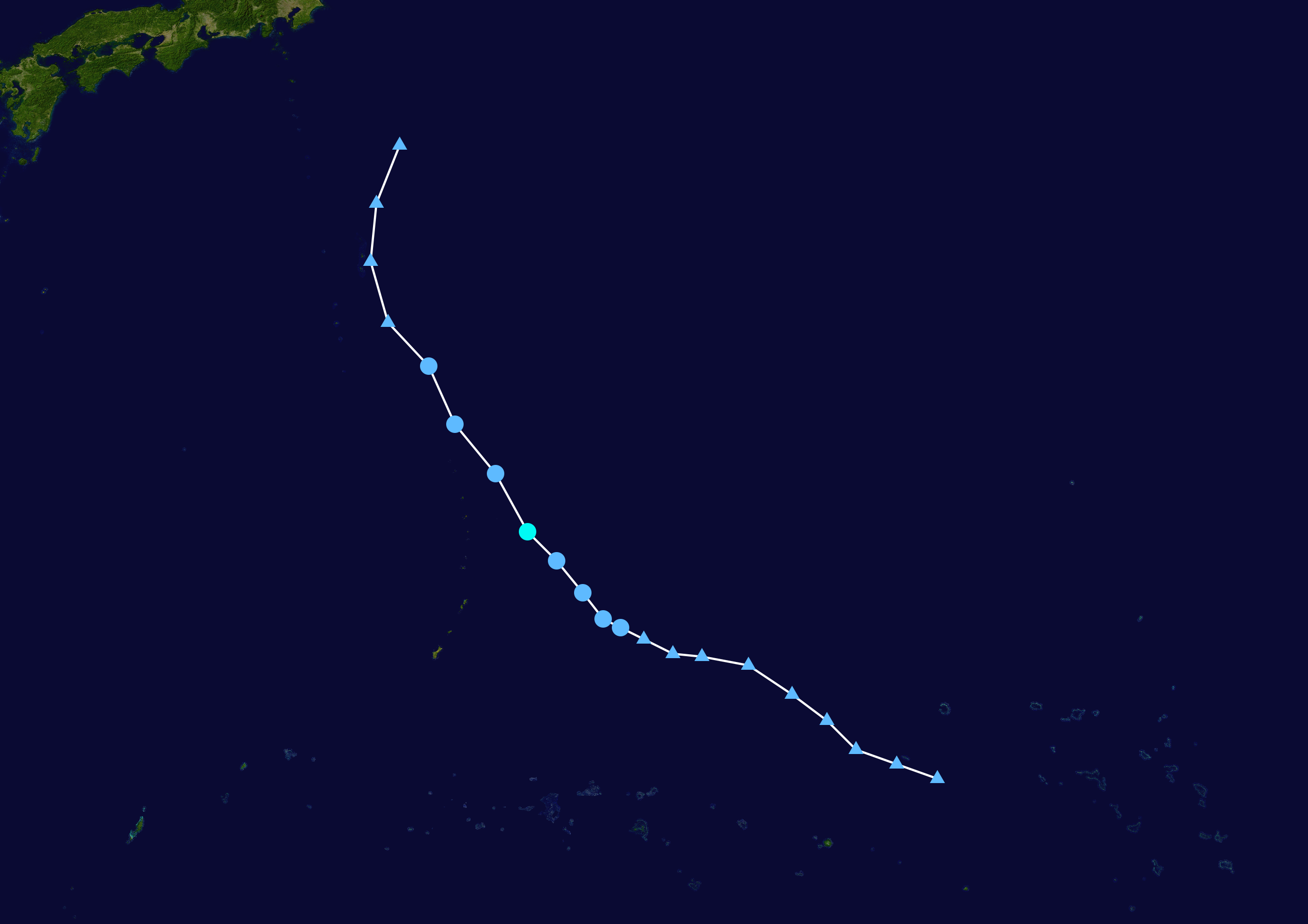
Storm path of Tropical Storm Peipah

- 00:00 UTC at 15.4°N 149.7°E – The JMA reports that Tropical Depression 17W has reached its peak intensity as a tropical storm, assigning it the name Peipah and estimating maximum sustained winds of 65 km/h (40 mph) and a minimum barometric pressure of 1,000 hPa (29.53 inHg).
- 00:00 UTC at 30.0°N 143.0°E – The JMA reports that a seventh tropical depression has formed.
- 06:00 UTC at 16.6°N 148.9°E – The JTWC reports that Tropical Depression Peipah (17W) has reached a minimum barometric pressure of 999 hPa (29.50 inHg).
- 12:00 UTC at 17.6°N 147.9°E – The JTWC reports that Tropical Depression Peipah (17W) has reached its peak winds as a tropical storm, estimating maximum 1-minute sustained winds of 65 km/h (40 mph).
- 12:00 UTC at 31.0°N 139.0°E – The JMA last notes the seventh tropical depression.
- 18:00 UTC at 19.6°N 146.8°E – The JTWC reports that Tropical Storm Peipah (17W) has weakened into a tropical depression.

==== September 16 ====
- 12:00 UTC at 25.0°N 142.9°E – The JMA reports that Tropical Storm Peipah (17W) has weakened into a tropical depression.
- 12:00 UTC at 24.8°N 143.1°E – The JTWC reports that Tropical Depression Peipah (17W) has weakened into a tropical disturbance.

==== September 17 ====
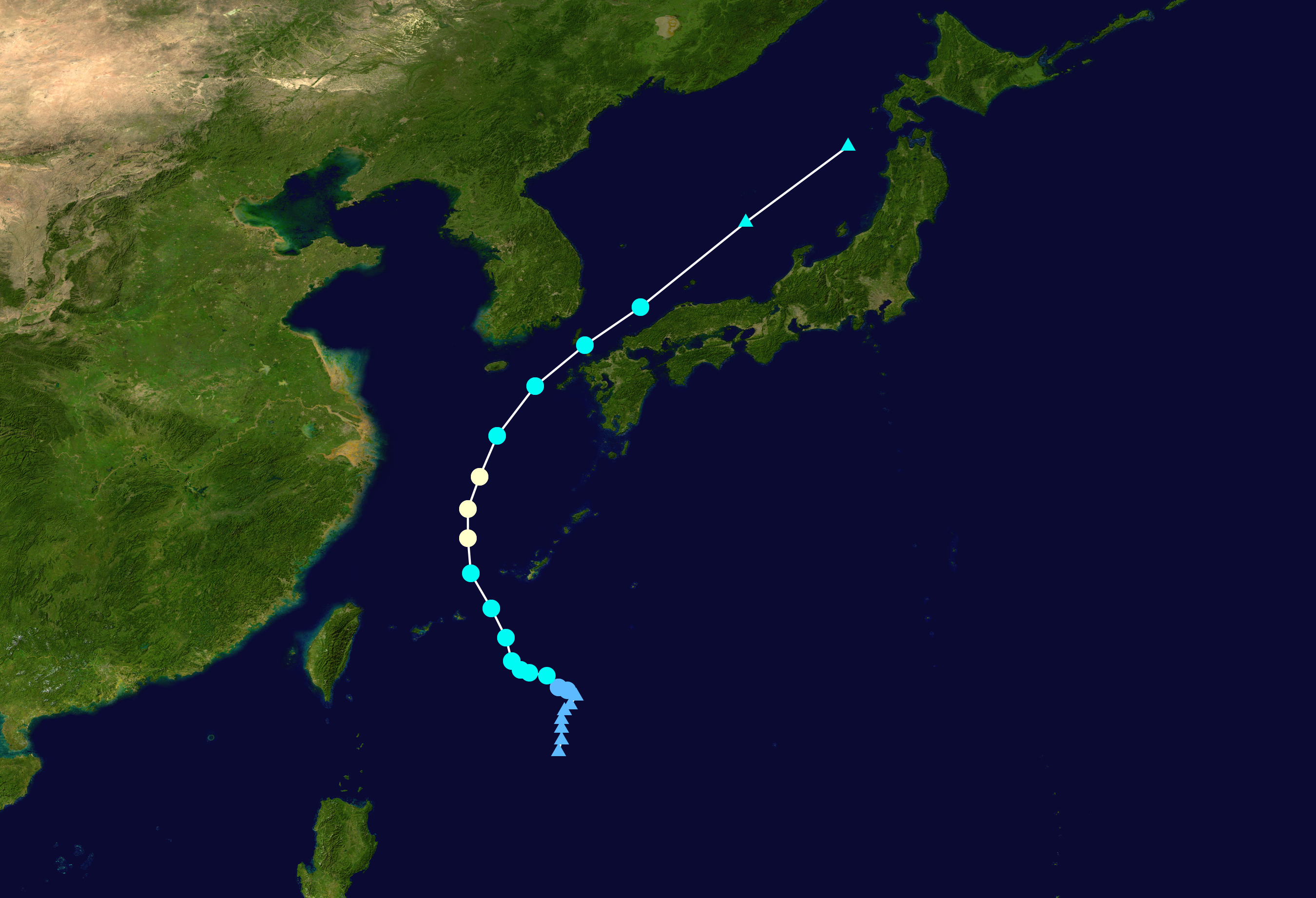
Storm path of Typhoon Tapah (Nimfa)

- 00:00 UTC at 28.9°N 142.7°E – The JMA last notes Tropical Depression Peipah (17W); it dissipates six hours later.
- 00:00 UTC at 20.0°N 128.7°E – The JMA reports that an eighth tropical depression has formed.
- 00:00 UTC at 20.0°N 128.8°E – The PAGASA reports that the eighth tropical depression has formed within the PAR, assigning it the name Nimfa.
- 06:00 UTC at 15.0°N 119.0°E – The JMA reports that a ninth tropical depression has formed.
- 18:00 UTC at 15.0°N 120.0°E – The JMA last notes the ninth tropical depression.

==== September 18 ====
- 18:00 UTC at 22.3°N 129.0°E – The JTWC begins tracking Tropical Depression Nimfa, designating it 18W.

==== September 19 ====
- 00:00 UTC at 22.4°N 128.7°E – The JMA reports that Tropical Depression 18W (Nimfa) has intensified into a tropical storm, assigning it the name Tapah.
- 09:00 UTC at 22.7°N 128.8°E – The JTWC reports that Tropical Depression Tapah (18W) has intensified into a tropical storm.

==== September 20 ====
- 06:00 UTC at 23.1°N 127.2°E – The JMA reports that Tropical Storm Tapah (18W) has intensified into a severe tropical storm.
- 18:00 UTC at 25.0°N 126.4°E – The JMA reports that Severe Tropical Storm Tapah (18W) has reached its peak intensity as a typhoon, estimating maximum sustained winds of 120 km/h (75 mph) and a minimum barometric pressure of 970 hPa (28.64 inHg).
- 18:00 UTC – The PAGASA reports that Severe Tropical Storm Tapah (18W) has exited the PAR.

==== September 21 ====
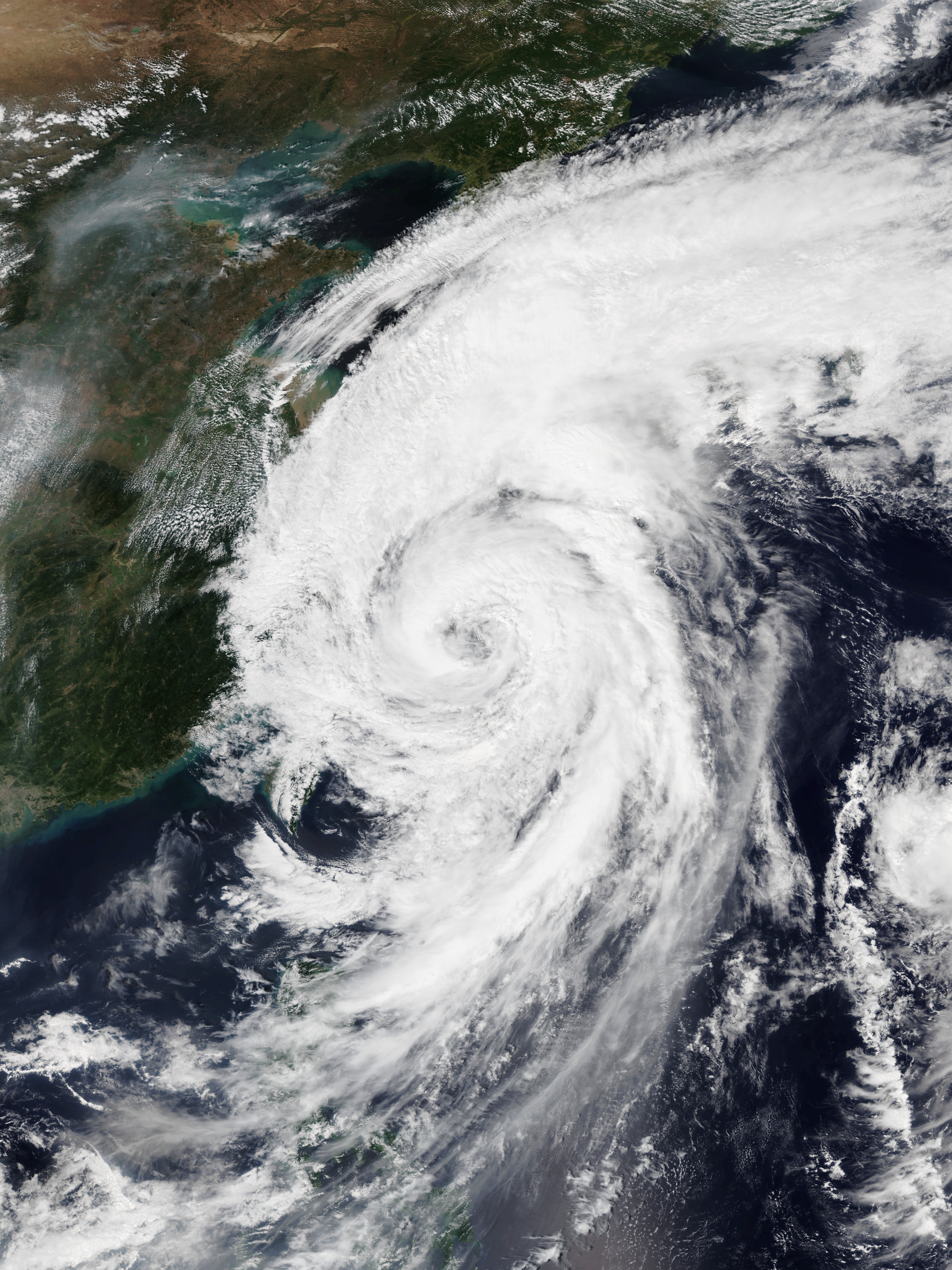
Satellite image of Typhoon Tapah at its peak intensity in the East China Sea on September 21

- 06:00 UTC at 27.5°N 125.6°E – The JTWC reports that Tropical Storm Tapah (18W) has reached its peak intensity as a Category 1-equivalent typhoon on the SSHWS, estimating maximum sustained winds of 120 km/h (75 mph) and a minimum barometric pressure of 969 hPa (28.61 inHg).

==== September 22 ====
- 00:00 UTC at 31.1°N 127.0°E – The JMA reports that Typhoon Tapah (18W) has weakened into a severe tropical storm.
- 00:00 UTC at 31.0°N 126.6°E – The JTWC reports that Typhoon Tapah (18W) has weakened into a tropical storm.
- 21:00 UTC at 36.3°N 132.7°E – The JMA reports that Severe Tropical Storm Tapah (18W) has weakened into a tropical storm.

==== September 23 ====
- 00:00 UTC at 37.6°N 134.2°E – The JMA reports that Tropical Storm Tapah (18W) has transitioned into an extratropical cyclone.
- 00:00 UTC at 38.3°N 135.1°E – The JTWC reports that Tropical Storm Tapah (18W) has transitioned into an extratropical cyclone.

==== September 24 ====
- 12:00 UTC at 9.6°N 155.0°E – The JMA reports that a tenth tropical depression has formed.

==== September 27 ====
- 06:00 UTC at 14.0°N 137.4°E – The JTWC begins tracking the tenth tropical depression, designating it 19W.
- 12:00 UTC at 14.4°N 135.9°E – The JTWC reports that Tropical Depression 19W has intensified into a tropical storm.
- 16:00 UTC – The PAGASA reports that Tropical Depression 19W has entered the PAR, assigning it the local name Onyok.

==== September 28 ====
- 00:00 UTC at 15.7°N 132.8°E – The JMA reports that Tropical Depression Onyok (19W) has intensified into a tropical storm, assigning it the name Mitag.

==== September 29 ====
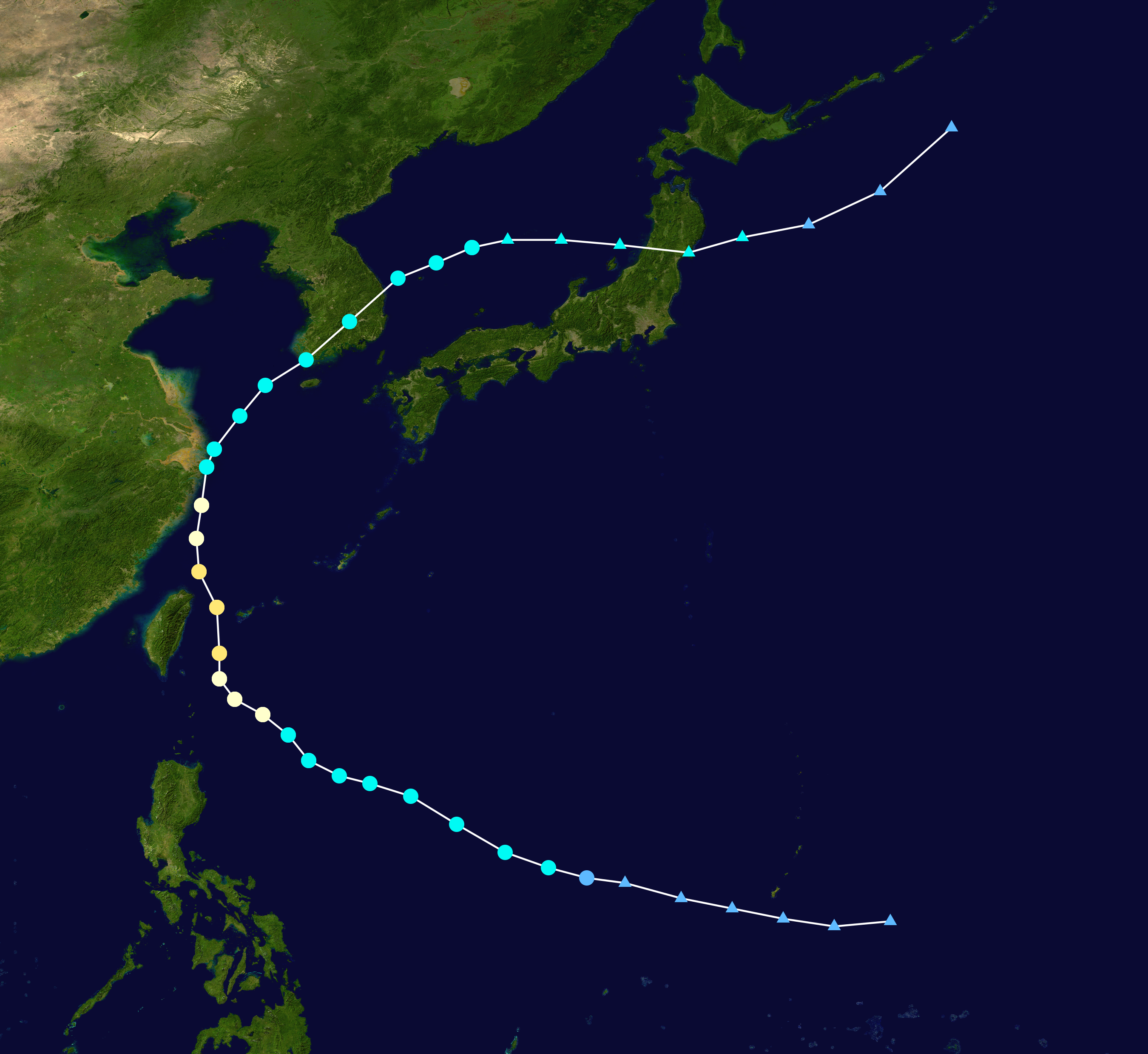
Storm path of Typhoon Mitag (Onyok)

- 00:00 UTC at 18.3°N 126.9°E – The JMA reports that Tropical Storm Mitag (19W) has intensified into a severe tropical storm.
- 12:00 UTC at 20.4°N 124.7°E – The JTWC reports that Tropical Storm Mitag (19W) has intensified into a Category 1-equivalent typhoon on the SSHWS.

==== September 30 ====
- 00:00 UTC at 21.7°N 123.0°E – The JMA reports that Severe Tropical Storm Mitag (19W) has intensified into a typhoon.
- 06:00 UTC at 22.8°N 123.0°E – The JTWC reports that Typhoon Mitag (19W) has intensified into a Category 2-equivalent typhoon on the SSHWS.
- 12:00 UTC at 24.6°N 122.9°E – The JMA reports that Typhoon Mitag (19W) has reached its peak intensity, estimating maximum sustained winds of 140 km/h (85 mph) and a minimum barometric pressure of 965 hPa (28.50 inHg).
- 12:00 UTC at 24.6°N 122.9°E – The JTWC reports that Typhoon Mitag (19W) has reached its peak intensity, estimating maximum 1-minute sustained winds of 165 km/h (105 mph) and a minimum barometric pressure of 961 hPa (28.38 inHg).
- 13:00 UTC – The PAGASA reports that Typhoon Mitag (19W) has exited the PAR.

=== October ===
==== October 1 ====
- 00:00 UTC at 27.3°N 122.1°E – The JTWC reports that Typhoon Mitag (19W) has weakened into a Category 1-equivalent typhoon on the SSHWS.
- 06:00 UTC at 28.6°N 122.2°E – The JMA reports that Typhoon Mitag (19W) has weakened into a severe tropical storm.
- 12:00 UTC at 30.1°N 122.5°E – The JTWC reports that Typhoon Mitag (19W) has weakened into a tropical storm.
- 12:00 UTC – Mitag (19W) makes landfall near Zhoushan, Zhejiang, China.
- 12:00 UTC at 14.0°N 134.0°E – The JMA reports that the first tropical depression of the month has formed.

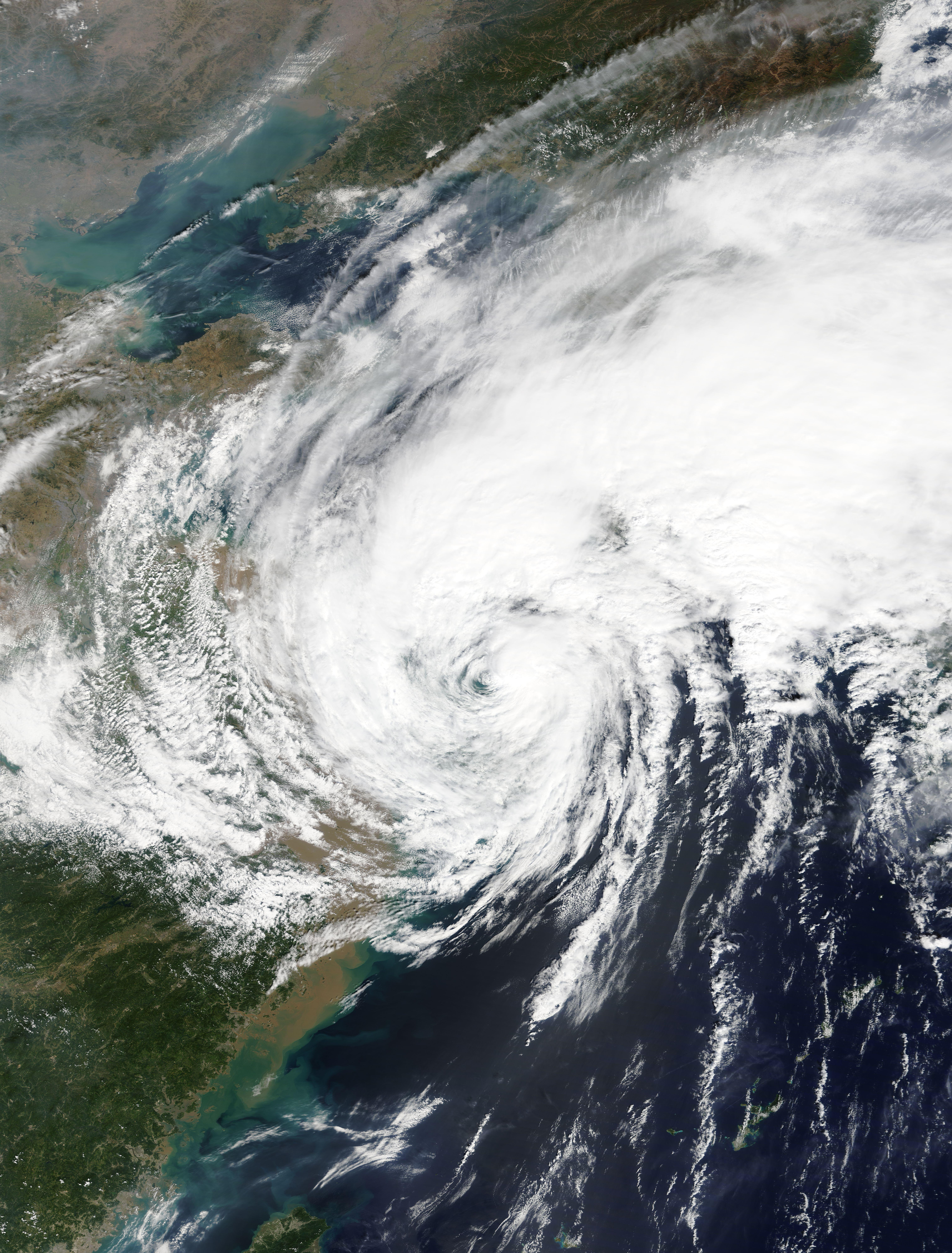
Satellite image of Severe Tropical Storm Mitag approaching the Korean Peninsula on October 2

==== October 2 ====
- 12:00 UTC at 34.4°N 126.3°E – The JMA reports that Severe Tropical Storm Mitag (19W) has weakened into a tropical storm.
- 12:00 UTC – Mitag (19W) makes its final landfall near Jindo County, South Jeolla Province, South Korea.

==== October 3 ====
- 00:00 UTC at 17.0°N 129.0°E – The JMA last notes the first tropical depression.
- 06:00 UTC at 38.0°N 131.0°E – The JMA reports that Tropical Storm Mitag (19W) has transitioned into an extratropical cyclone.
- 18:00 UTC at 39.0°N 134.3°E – The JTWC reports that Tropical Storm Mitag (19W) has transitioned into an extratropical cyclone.

==== October 4 ====
- 18:00 UTC at 15.7°N 164.4°E – The JMA reports that a second tropical depression has formed.

==== October 5 ====
- 00:00 UTC at 15.3°N 162.3°E – The JTWC begins tracking the second tropical depression, designating it 20W.
- 18:00 UTC at 15.1°N 157.4°E – The JMA reports that Tropical Depression 20W has intensified into a tropical storm, assigning it the name Hagibis.
- 18:00 UTC at 15.0°N 157.6°E – The JTWC reports that Tropical Depression Hagibis (20W) has intensified into a tropical storm.

==== October 6 ====
- 06:00 UTC at 14.3°N 154.1°E – The JMA reports that Tropical Storm Hagibis (20W) has intensified into a severe tropical storm.
- 12:00 UTC at 14.6°N 153.0°E – The JMA reports that Severe Tropical Storm Hagibis has intensified into a typhoon.
- 18:00 UTC at 14.9°N 151.1°E – The JTWC reports that Tropical Storm Hagibis (20W) has intensified into a Category 1-equivalent typhoon on the SSHWS.

==== October 7 ====
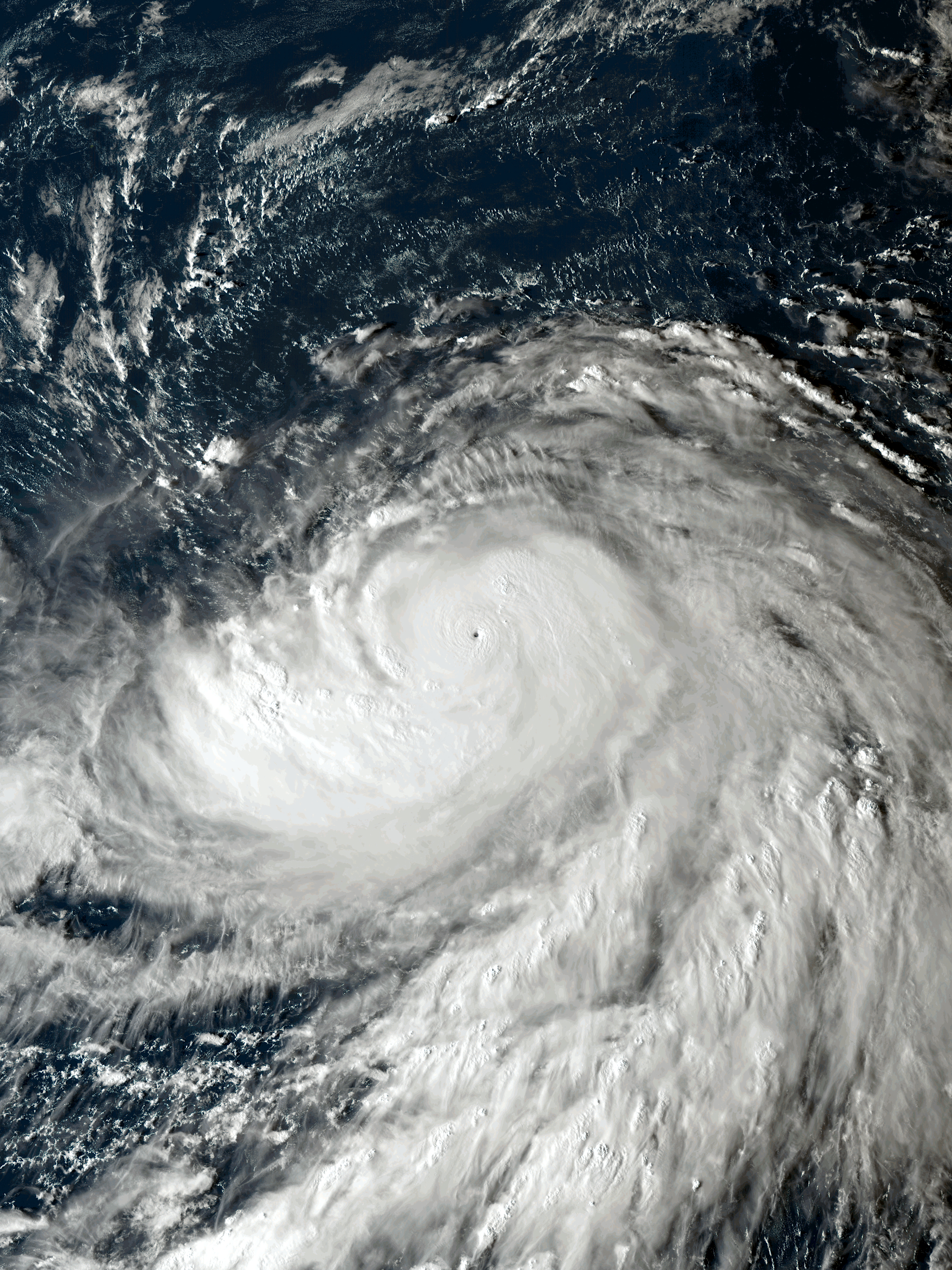
Satellite image of Typhoon Hagibis reaching its peak intensity over the Northern Mariana Islands on October 7

- 00:00 UTC at 15.1°N 149.6°E – The JMA reports that Typhoon Hagibis (20W) has intensified into a very strong typhoon.
- 00:00 UTC at 15.2°N 149.5°E – The JTWC reports that Typhoon Hagibis (20W) has intensified into a Category 3-equivalent typhoon on the SSHWS, skipping Category 2-equivalent status.
- 06:00 UTC at 15.6°N 148.2°E – The JTWC reports that Typhoon Hagibis (20W) has intensified into a Category 5-equivalent super typhoon on the SSHWS, skipping Category 4-equivalent status.
- 10:00 UTC at 15.9°N 147.0°E – The JTWC reports that Super Typhoon Hagibis (20W) has reached its peak winds, estimating maximum 1-minute sustained winds of 295 km/h (185 mph).
- 12:00 UTC at 16.1°N 146.6°E – The JMA reports that Typhoon Hagibis (20W) has reached its peak intensity as a violent typhoon, estimating maximum sustained winds of 195 km/h (120 mph) and a minimum barometric pressure of 915 hPa (27.02 inHg).
- 12:00 UTC at 16.1°N 146.6°E – The JTWC reports that Super Typhoon Hagibis (20W) has reached a minimum barometric pressure of 890 hPa (26.28 inHg).

==== October 8 ====
- 00:00 UTC at 16.9°N 143.7°E – The JTWC reports that Super Typhoon Hagibis (20W) has weakened into a Category 4-equivalent super typhoon on the SSHWS.
- 06:00 UTC at 17.7°N 142.7°E – The JTWC reports that Super Typhoon Hagibis (20W) has weakened into a typhoon.
- 18:00 UTC at 19.2°N 140.9°E – The JTWC reports that Typhoon Hagibis (20W) has intensified into a Category 5-equivalent super typhoon on the SSHWS.

==== October 9 ====
- 04:00 UTC at 20.3°N 140.1°E – The JTWC reports that Super Typhoon Hagibis (20W) has reached its secondary peak intensity, estimating maximum 1-minute sustained winds of 280 km/h (175 mph) and a barometric pressure of 896 hPa (26.46 inHg).
- 18:00 UTC at 22.0°N 139.8°E – The JTWC reports that Super Typhoon Hagibis (20W) has weakened into a Category 4-equivalent super typhoon on the SSHWS.

==== October 10 ====
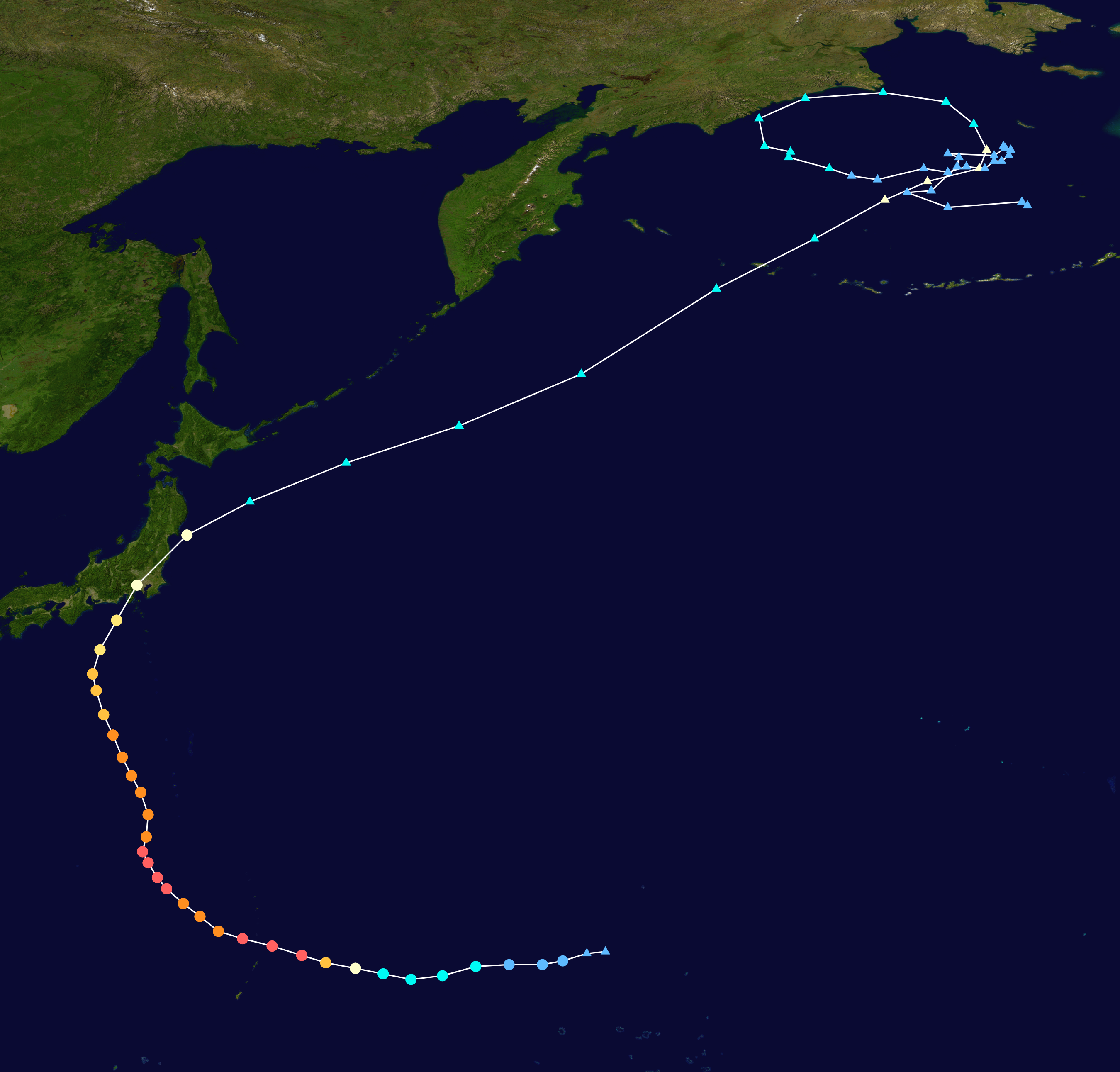
Storm path of Typhoon Hagibis

- 12:00 UTC at 25.3°N 139.0°E – The JMA reports that Typhoon Hagibis (20W) has weakened from a violent typhoon into a very strong typhoon.
- 12:00 UTC at 25.3°N 139.0°E – The JTWC reports that Super Typhoon Hagibis (20W) has weakened into a typhoon.

==== October 11 ====
- 06:00 UTC at 28.6°N 137.5°E – The JTWC reports that Typhoon Hagibis (20W) has weakened into a Category 3-equivalent typhoon on the SSHWS.

==== October 12 ====
- 00:00 UTC at 32.0°N 137.4°E – The JMA reports that Typhoon Hagibis has weakened from a very strong typhoon into a typhoon.
- 00:00 UTC at 32.1°N 137.3°E – The JTWC reports that Typhoon Hagibis (20W) has weakened into a Category 2-equivalent typhoon on the SSHWS.
- <10:00 UTC – Hagibis (20W) makes landfall over Izu Peninsula, Shizuoka Prefecture, Japan.
- 12:00 UTC at 35.6°N 139.3°E – The JTWC reports that Typhoon Hagibis (20W) has weakened into a Category 1-equivalent typhoon on the SSHWS.
- 18:00 UTC at 38.2°N 141.8°E – The JMA reports that Typhoon Hagibis (20W) has weakened into a severe tropical storm.

==== October 13 ====
- 00:00 UTC at 40.1°N 145.4°E – The JTWC reports that Typhoon Hagibis (20W) has transitioned into an extratropical cyclone.
- 03:00 UTC at 41.0°N 147.0°E – The JMA reports that Severe Tropical Storm Hagibis (20W) has transitioned into an extratropical cyclone.

==== October 15 ====
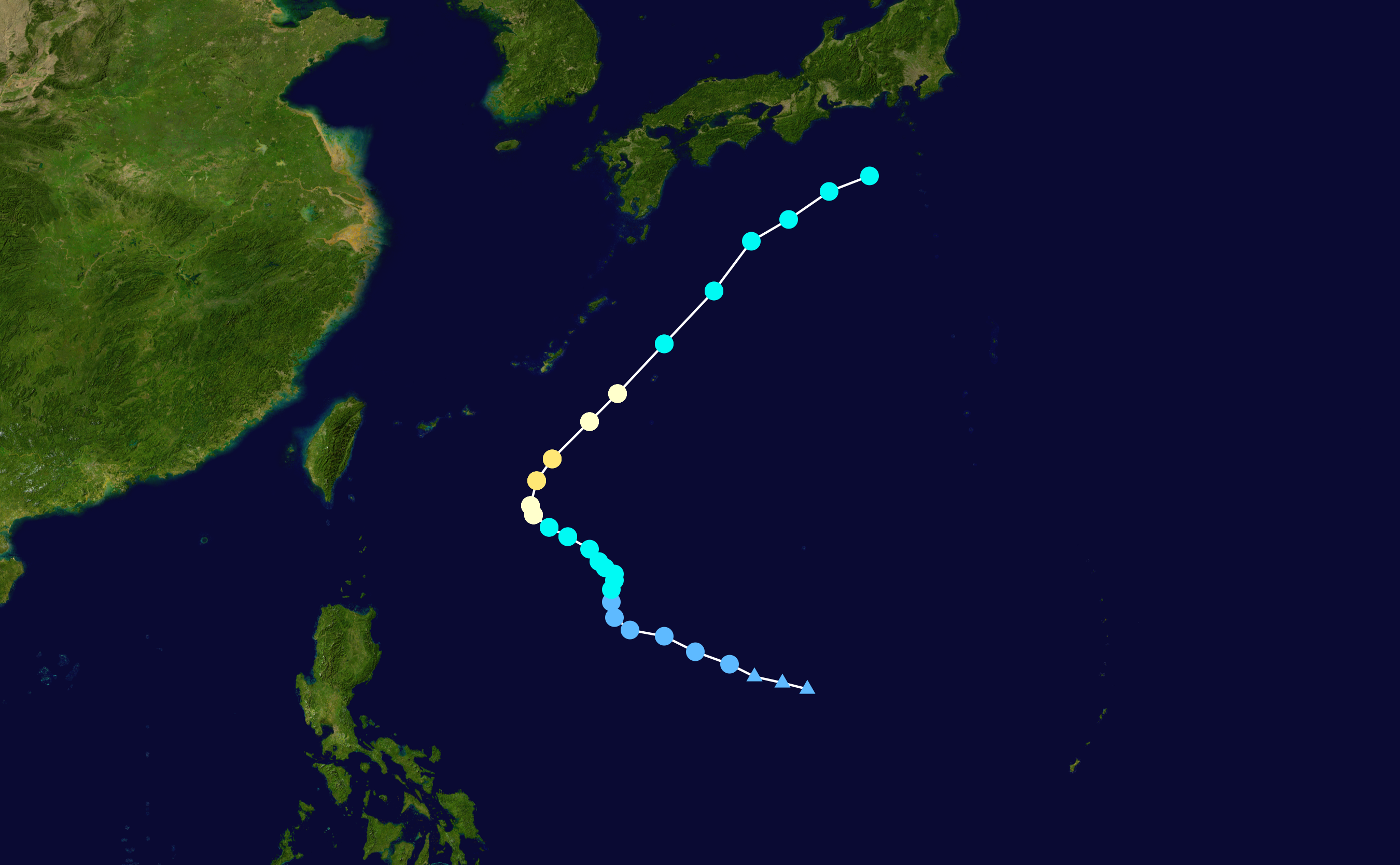
Storm path of Typhoon Neoguri (Perla)

- 00:00 UTC at 15.8°N 136.4°E – The JMA reports that a third tropical depression has formed.
- 18:00 UTC at 16.7°N 133.7°E – The JTWC begins tracking the third tropical depression, designating it 21W.
- 18:00 UTC at 16.8°N 133.7°E – The PAGASA reports that Tropical Depression 21W has formed within the PAR, assigning it the local name Perla.

==== October 17 ====
- 00:00 UTC at 18.6°N 130.3°E – The JMA reports that Tropical Depression 21W (Perla) has intensified into a tropical storm, assigning it the name Neoguri.
- 06:00 UTC at 19.1°N 129.9°E – The JTWC reports that Tropical Depression Neoguri (21W) has intensified into a tropical storm.

==== October 18 ====
- 06:00 UTC at 8.7°N 161.2°E – The JMA reports that a fourth tropical depression has formed.
- 18:00 UTC at 20.6°N 128.7°E – The JMA reports that Tropical Storm Neoguri (21W) has intensified into a severe tropical storm.
- 18:00 UTC at 9.6°N 158.4°E – The JTWC begins tracking the fourth tropical depression, designating it 22W.

==== October 19 ====
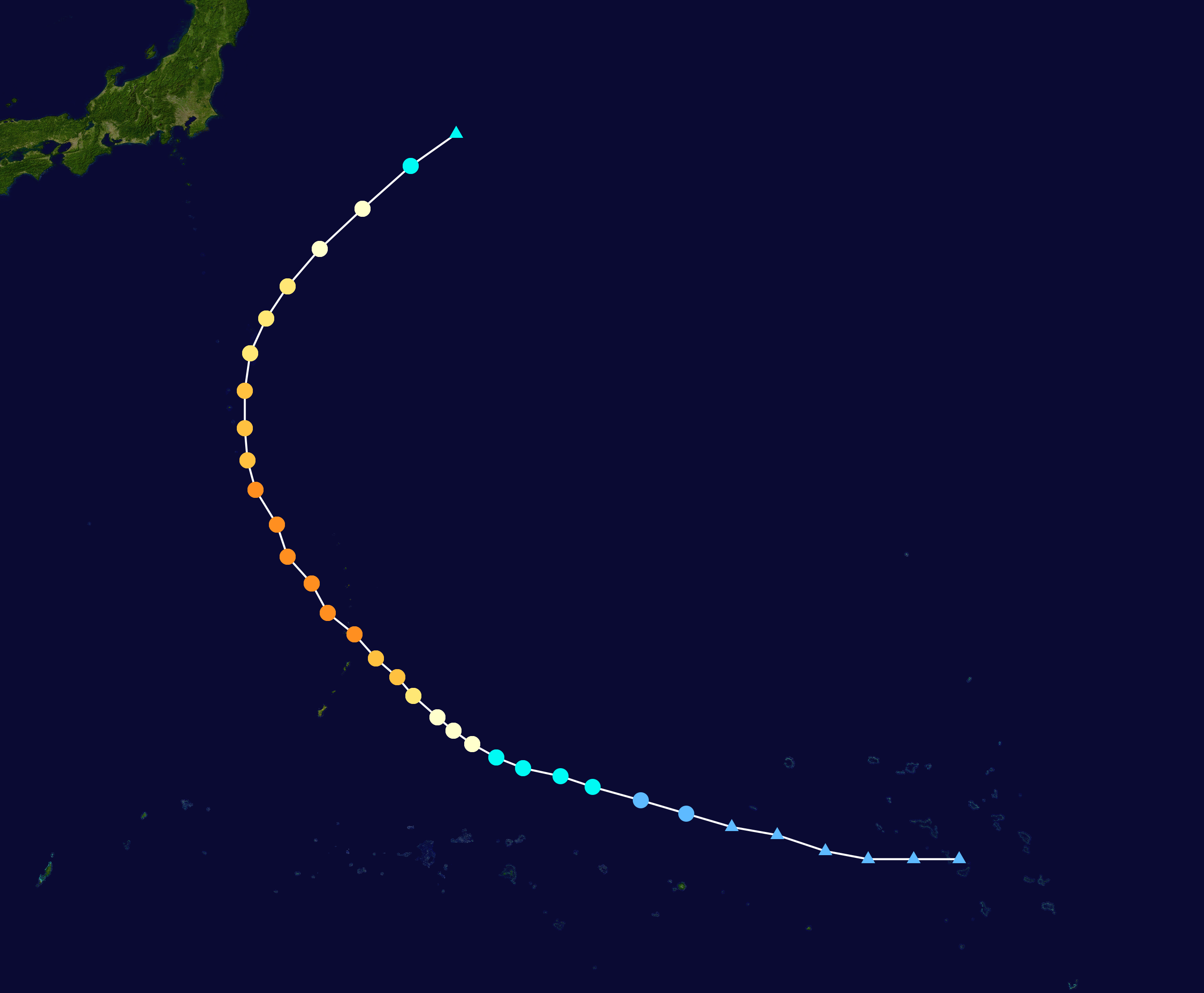
Storm path of Typhoon Bualoi

- 06:00 UTC at 21.5°N 127.4°E – The JTWC reports that Tropical Storm Neoguri (21W) has intensified into a Category 1-equivalent typhoon on the SSHWS.
- 06:00 UTC at 10.6°N 155.0°E – The JMA reports that Tropical Depression 22W has intensified into a tropical storm, assigning it the name Bualoi.
- 06:00 UTC at 10.6°N 154.9°E – The JTWC reports that Tropical Depression Bualoi (22W) has intensified into a tropical storm.
- 12:00 UTC at 21.8°N 127.3°E – The JMA reports that Severe Tropical Storm Neoguri (21W) has intensified into a typhoon.
- 18:00 UTC at 22.6°N 127.5°E – The JMA reports that Typhoon Neoguri (21W) has reached its peak intensity, estimating maximum sustained winds of 140 km/h (85 mph) and a minimum barometric pressure of 970 hPa (28.64 inHg).
- 18:00 UTC at 22.6°N 127.5°E – The JTWC reports that Typhoon Neoguri (21W) has reached its peak intensity, estimating maximum sustained winds of 175 km/h (110 mph) and a minimum barometric pressure of 964 hPa (28.47 inHg).

==== October 20 ====
- 00:00 UTC at 11.3°N 151.5°E – The JMA reports that Tropical Storm Bualoi (22W) has intensified into a severe tropical storm.
- 06:00 UTC at 24.5°N 129.2°E – The JTWC reports that Typhoon Neoguri (21W) has weakened into a Category 1-equivalent typhoon on the SSHWS.
- 06:00 UTC at 12.2°N 150.4°E – The JTWC reports that Tropical Storm Bualoi (22W) has intensified into a Category 1-equivalent typhoon on the SSHWS.
- 10:00 UTC – the PAGASA reports that Typhoon Neoguri (21W) has exited the PAR.
- 12:00 UTC at 12.6°N 149.8°E – The JMA reports that Severe Tropical Storm Bualoi (22W) has intensified into a typhoon.
- 18:00 UTC at 27.1°N 131.3°E – The JMA reports that Typhoon Neoguri (21W) has weakened into a severe tropical storm.
- 18:00 UTC at 27.0°N 131.6°E – The JTWC reports that Typhoon Neoguri (21W) has weakened into a tropical storm.

==== October 21 ====
- 00:00 UTC at 14.0°N 148.2°E – The JTWC reports that Typhoon Bualoi (22W) has intensified into a Category 2-equivalent typhoon on the SSHWS.
- 06:00 UTC at 14.7°N 147.6°E – The JMA reports that Typhoon Bualoi (22W) has intensified into a very strong typhoon.
- 06:00 UTC at 14.7°N 147.6°E – The JTWC reports that Typhoon Bualoi (22W) has intensified into a Category 3-equivalent typhoon on the SSHWS.
- 12:00 UTC at 31.3°N 135.3°E – The JMA reports that Typhoon Neoguri (21W) has transitioned into an extratropical cyclone.
- 18:00 UTC at 16.3°N 146.0°E – The JTWC reports that Typhoon Bualoi (22W) has intensified into a Category 4-equivalent typhoon on the SSHWS.

==== October 22 ====
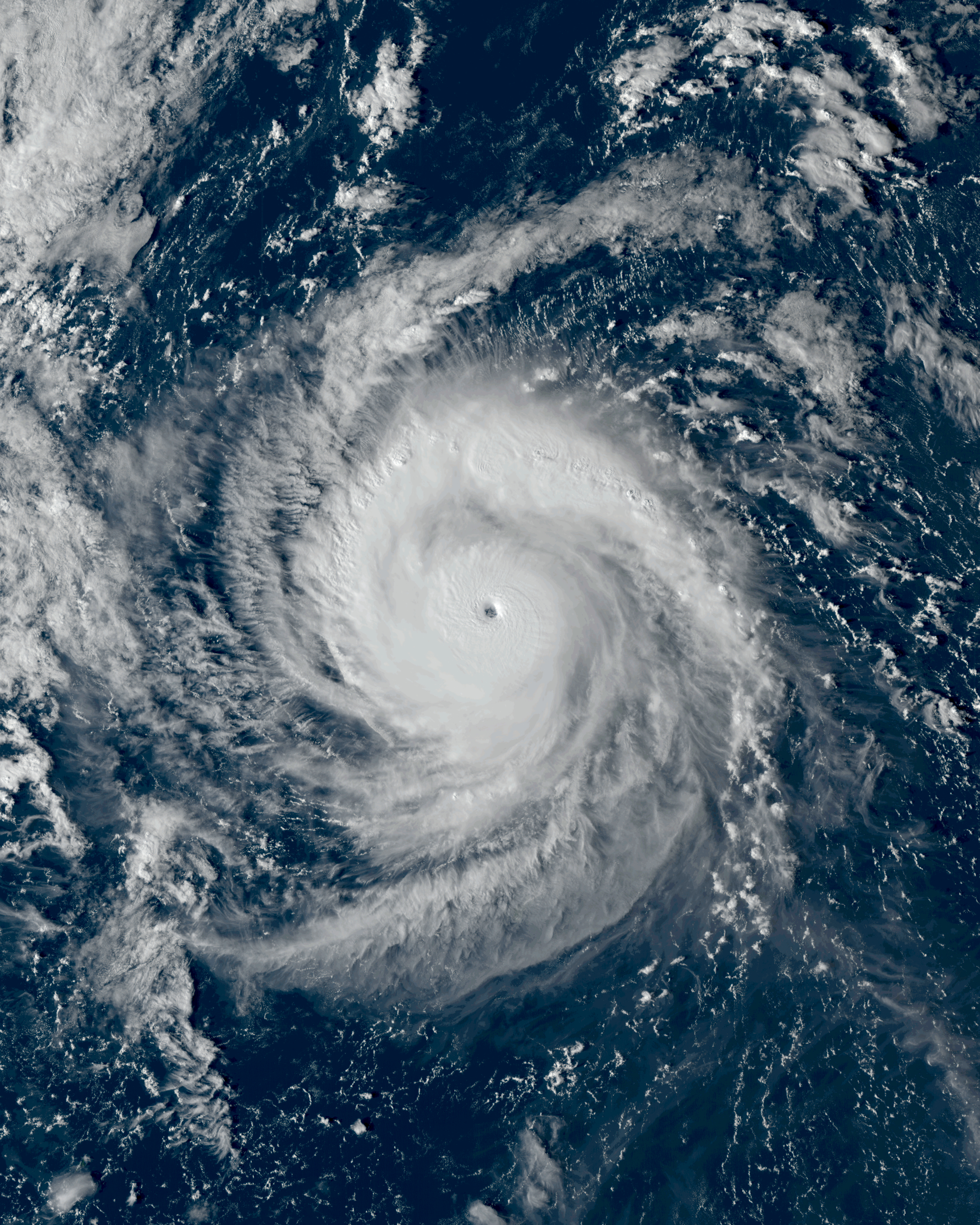
Satellite image of Typhoon Bualoi near its peak intensity on October 22

- 00:00 UTC at 32.4°N 138.2°E – The JTWC last notes Tropical Storm Neoguri (21W).
- 00:00 UTC at 19.0°N 135.0°E – The JMA reports that a fifth tropical depression has formed; it is last noted.
- 06:00 UTC at 18.2°N 144.4°E – The JMA reports that Typhoon Bualoi (22W) has reached its peak intensity, estimating maximum sustained winds of 185 km/h (115 mph).
- 06:00 UTC at 18.2°N 144.4°E – The JTWC reports that Typhoon Bualoi (22W) has intensified into a super typhoon.
- 09:00 UTC at 18.7°N 144.0°E – The JTWC reports that Super Typhoon Bualoi (22W) has reached its peak intensity as a Category 5-equivalent super typhoon on the SSHWS, estimating maximum 1-minute sustained winds of 260 km/h (160 mph) and a minimum barometric pressure of 922 hPa (27.23 inHg).
- 12:00 UTC at 19.2°N 143.5°E – The JTWC reports that Super Typhoon Bualoi (22W) has weakened into a Category 4-equivalent super typhoon on the SSHWS.
- 18:00 UTC at 20.4°N 143.1°E – The JTWC reports that Super Typhoon Bualoi (22W) has weakened into a typhoon.

==== October 23 ====
- 06:00 UTC at 22.8°N 142.0°E – The JTWC reports that Typhoon Bualoi (22W) has weakened into a Category 3-equivalent typhoon on the SSHWS.
- 21:00 UTC at 26.1°N 142.0°E – The JMA reports that Typhoon Bualoi (22W) has weakened from a very strong typhoon into a typhoon.

==== October 24 ====
- 00:00 UTC at 26.8°N 142.1°E – The JTWC reports that Typhoon Bualoi (22W) has weakened into a Category 2-equivalent typhoon on the SSHWS.
- 18:00 UTC at 30.7°N 144.7°E – The JTWC reports that Typhoon Bualoi (22W) has weakened into a Category 1-equivalent typhoon on the SSHWS.

==== October 25 ====
- 06:00 UTC at 34.1°N 148.1°E – The JMA reports that Typhoon Bualoi (22W) has weakened into a severe tropical storm.
- 06:00 UTC at 33.8°N 148.1°E – The JTWC reports that Typhoon Bualoi (22W) has weakened into a tropical storm.
- 12:00 UTC at 35.1°N 148.6°E – The JMA reports that Severe Tropical Storm Bualoi (22W) has transitioned into an extratropical cyclone.
- 12:00 UTC at 35.0°N 149.8°E – The JTWC reports that Tropical Storm Bualoi (22W) has transitioned into an extratropical cyclone.

==== October 28 ====
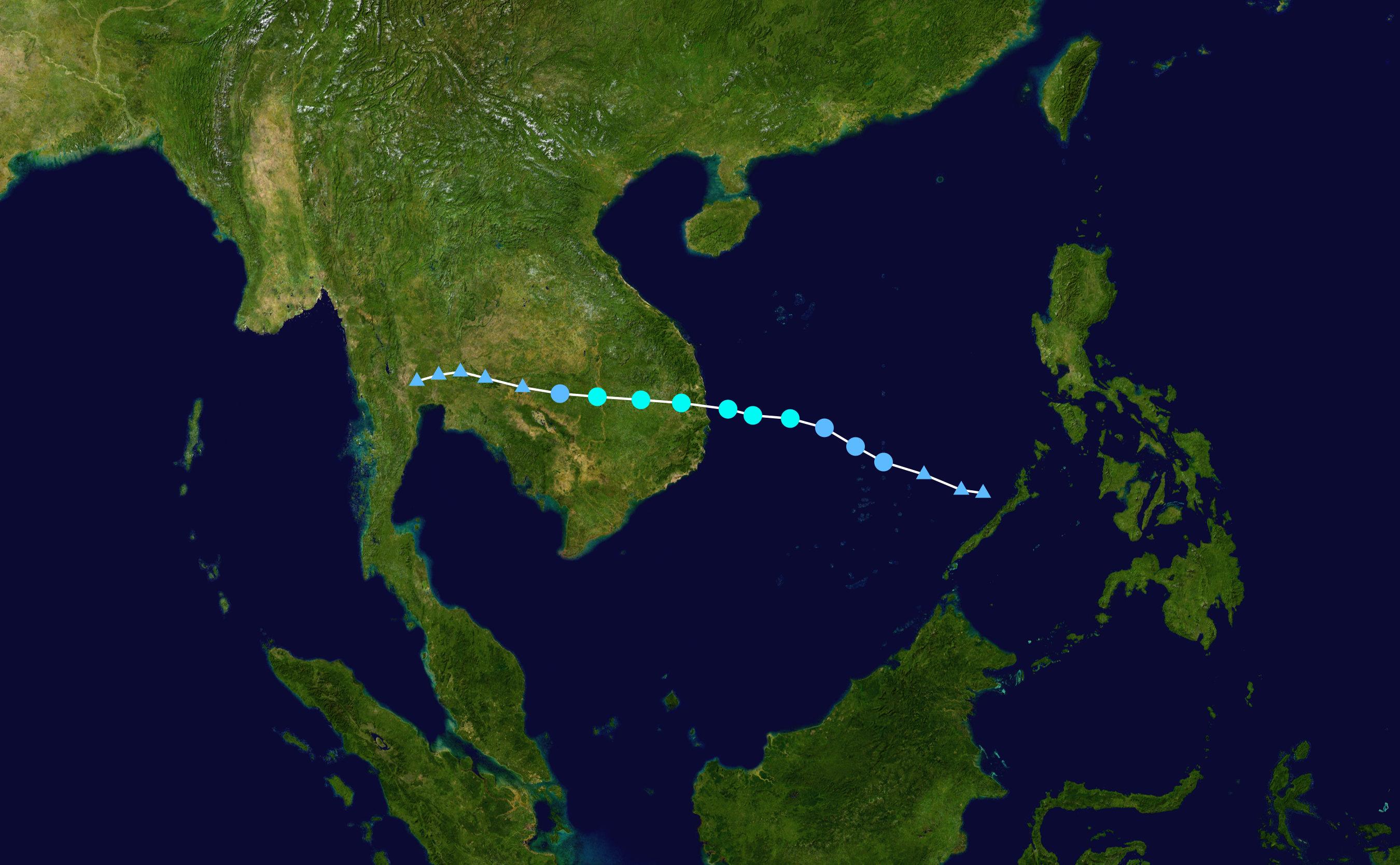
Storm path of Severe Tropical Storm Matmo

- 18:00 UTC at 11.9°N 116.6°E – The JMA reports that a sixth tropical depression has formed.

==== October 29 ====
- 06:00 UTC at 11.6°N 115.0°E – The JTWC begins tracking sixth the tropical depression, designating it 23W.
- 18:00 UTC at 13.3°N 112.6°E – The JMA reports that Tropical Depression 23W has intensified into a tropical storm, assigning it the name Matmo.

==== October 30 ====
- 00:00 UTC at 13.0°N 112.0°E – The JTWC reports that Tropical Depression Matmo (23W) has intensified into a tropical storm.
- 06:00 UTC at 13.2°N 110.7°E – The JMA reports that Tropical Storm Matmo (23W) has reached its peak intensity as a severe tropical storm, estimating maximum sustained winds of 95 km/h (60 mph) and a minimum barometric pressure of 992 hPa (29.29 inHg).
- 15:00 UTC – Matmo (23W) makes landfall over Vietnam.
- 15:00 UTC at 13.4°N 109.4°E – The JTWC reports that Tropical Storm Matmo (23W) has reached its initial peak intensity, estimating maximum 1-minute sustained winds of 100 km/h (65 mph) and a barometric pressure of 990 hPa (29.23 inHg).

==== October 31 ====
- 00:00 UTC at 13.7°N 107.2°E – The JMA reports that Severe Tropical Storm Matmo (23W) has weakened into a tropical storm.
- 06:00 UTC at 13.8°N 106.1°E – The JMA reports that Tropical Storm Matmo (23W) has weakened into a tropical depression.
- 12:00 UTC at 13.8°N 104.6°E – The JTWC reports that Tropical Storm Matmo (23W) has weakened into a tropical depression.
- 18:00 UTC at 13.7°N 104.0°E – The JMA last notes Tropical Depression Matmo (23W); it dissipates six hours later.
- 18:00 UTC at 14.0°N 103.4°E – The JTWC reports that Tropical Depression Matmo (23W) has weakened into a tropical disturbance.

=== November ===
==== November 1 ====
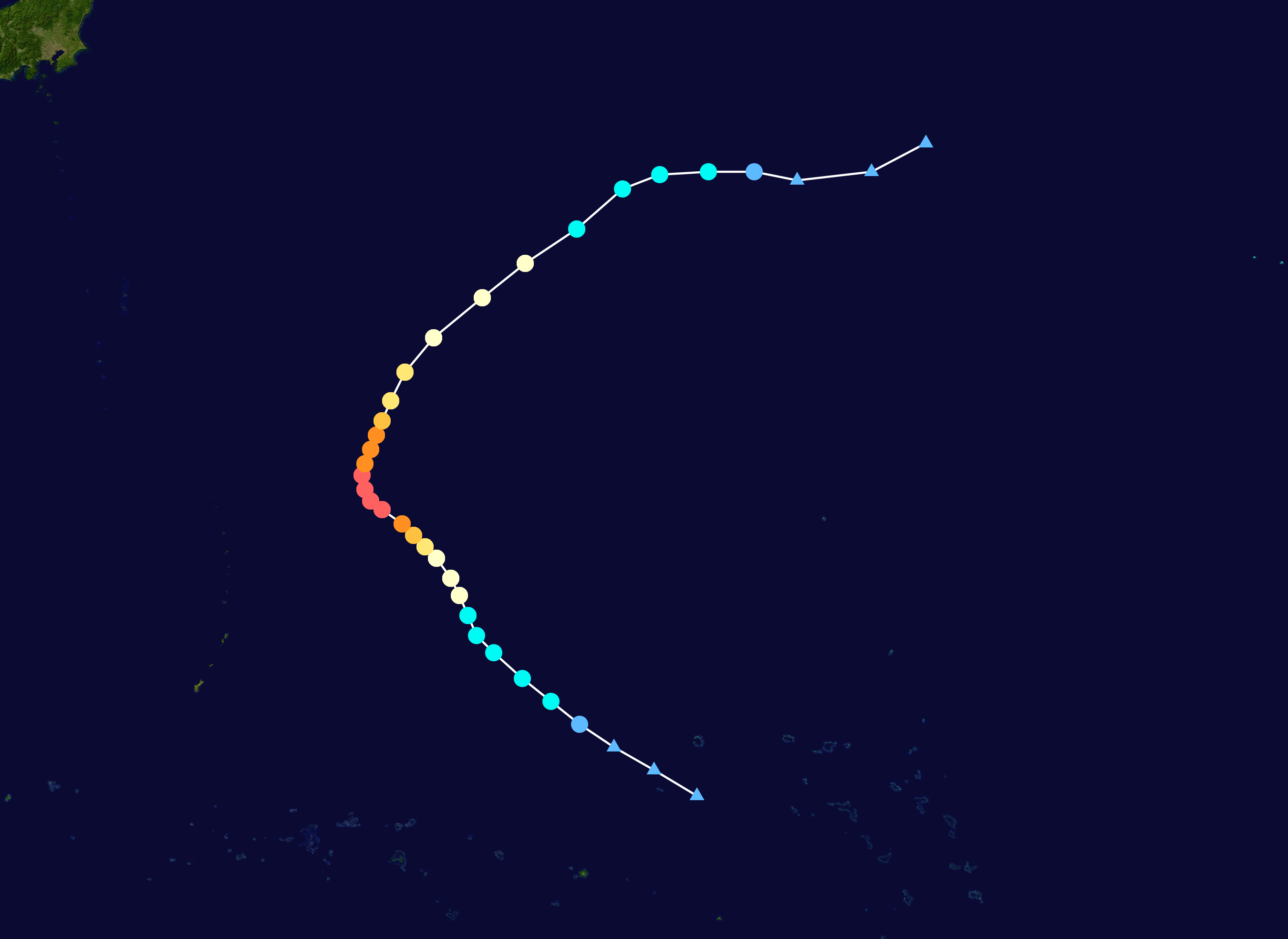
Storm path of Typhoon Halong

- 12:00 UTC at 9.6°N 162.2°E – The JMA reports that the first tropical depression of the month has formed.

==== November 2 ====
- 06:00 UTC at 12.1°N 158.1°E – The JTWC begins tracking the first tropical depression, designating it 24W.
- 12:00 UTC at 13.4°N 157.7°E – The JMA reports that Tropical Depression 24W has intensified into a tropical storm, assigning it the name Halong.
- 12:00 UTC at 12.9°N 157.1°E – The JTWC reports that Tropical Depression Halong (24W) has intensified into a tropical storm.

==== November 3 ====
- 18:00 UTC at 16.6°N 153.8°E – The JMA reports that Tropical Storm Halong (24W) has intensified into a severe tropical storm.
- 18:00 UTC at 16.6°N 153.9°E – The JTWC reports that Tropical Storm Halong (24W) has intensified into a Category 1-equivalent typhoon on the SSHWS.

==== November 4 ====
- 00:00 UTC at 12.7°N 113.7°E – The JMA reports that a second tropical depression has formed.
- 06:00 UTC at 17.8°N 153.2°E – The JMA reports that Severe Tropical Storm Halong (24W) has intensified into a typhoon.
- 12:00 UTC at 18.3°N 152.7°E – The JTWC reports that Typhoon Halong (24W) has intensified into a Category 2-equivalent typhoon on the SSHWS.
- 18:00 UTC at 18.7°N 152.3°E – The JTWC reports that Typhoon Halong (24W) has intensified into a Category 3-equivalent typhoon on the SSHWS.

==== November 5 ====
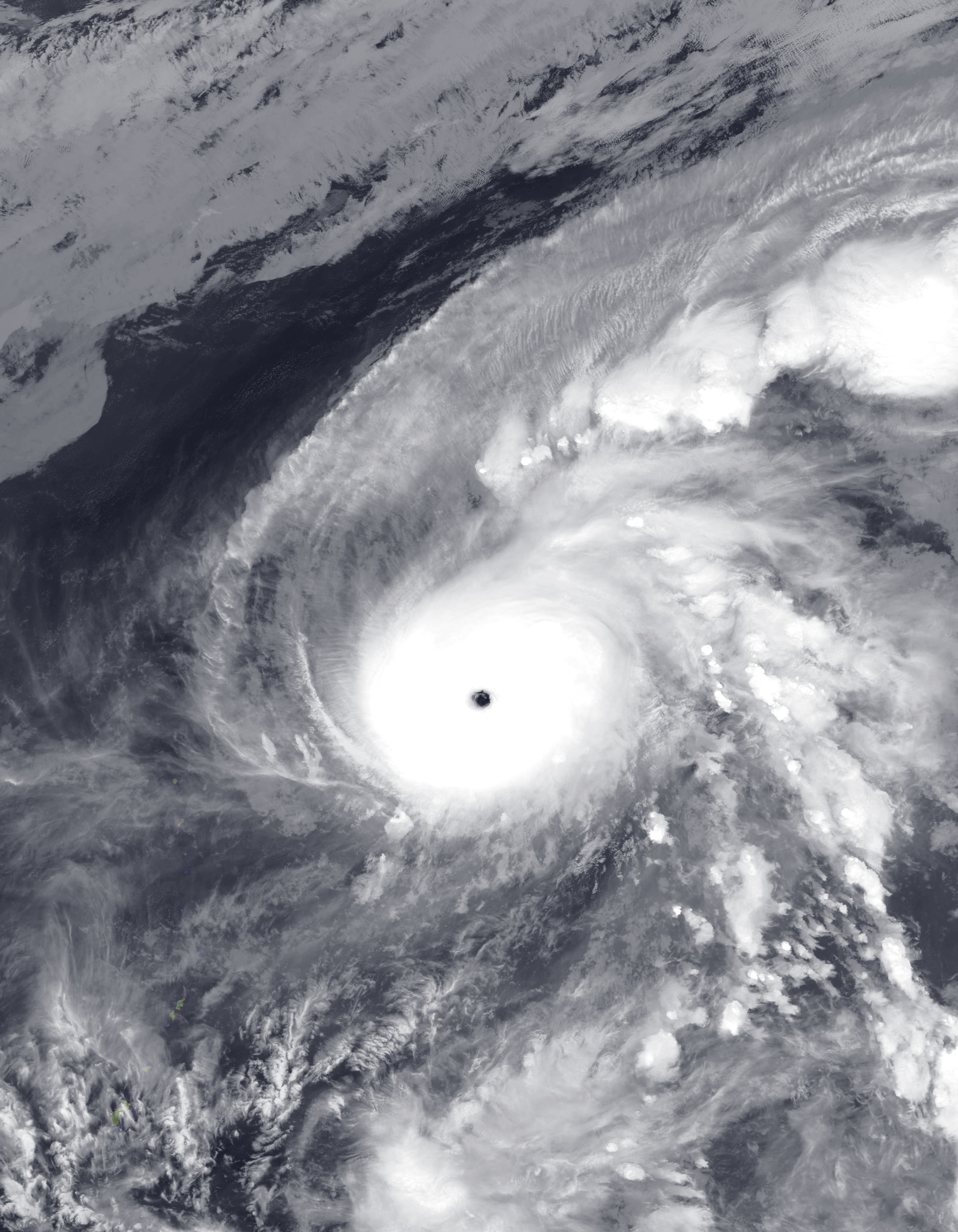
Infrared satellite image of Typhoon Halong at its peak intensity on November 5

- 00:00 UTC at 19.1°N 151.9°E – The JMA reports that Typhoon Halong (24W) has intensified into a very strong typhoon.
- 00:00 UTC at 19.1°N 151.9°E – The JTWC reports that Typhoon Halong (24W) has intensified into a Category 4-equivalent typhoon on the SSHWS.
- 03:00 UTC – The PAGASA reports that the second tropical depression has entered the PAR, assigning it the local name Quiel.
- 06:00 UTC at 19.6°N 151.2°E – The JTWC reports that Typhoon Halong (24W) has intensified into a Category 5-equivalent super typhoon on the SSHWS.
- 12:00 UTC at 19.9°N 150.8°E – The JMA reports that Typhoon Halong (24W) has reached its peak intensity as a violent typhoon, estimating maximum sustained winds of 215 km/h (130 mph) and a minimum barometric pressure of 905 hPa (26.72 inHg).
- 15:00 UTC at 20.1°N 150.7°E – The JTWC reports that Super Typhoon Halong (24W) has reached its peak intensity, estimating maximum 1-minute sustained winds of 305 km/h (190 mph) and a minimum barometric pressure of 888 hPa (26.22 inHg).
- 18:00 UTC at 13.5°N 116.0°E – The JMA reports that Tropical Depression Quiel has intensified into a tropical storm, assigning it the name Nakri.
- 18:00 UTC at 13.6°N 116.2°E – The JTWC begins tracking Tropical Depression Nakri, designating it 25W.

==== November 6 ====
- 06:00 UTC at 21.2°N 150.6°E – The JTWC reports that Super Typhoon Halong (24W) has weakened into a Category 4-equivalent super typhoon.
- 06:00 UTC at 13.3°N 116.6°E – The JTWC reports that Tropical Depression Nakri (25W) has intensified into a tropical storm.
- 12:00 UTC at 21.7°N 150.8°E – The JTWC reports that Super Typhoon Halong (24W) has weakened into a typhoon.
- 18:00 UTC at 22.3°N 151.0°E – The JMA reports that Typhoon Halong (24W) has weakened from a violent typhoon into a very strong typhoon.

==== November 7 ====
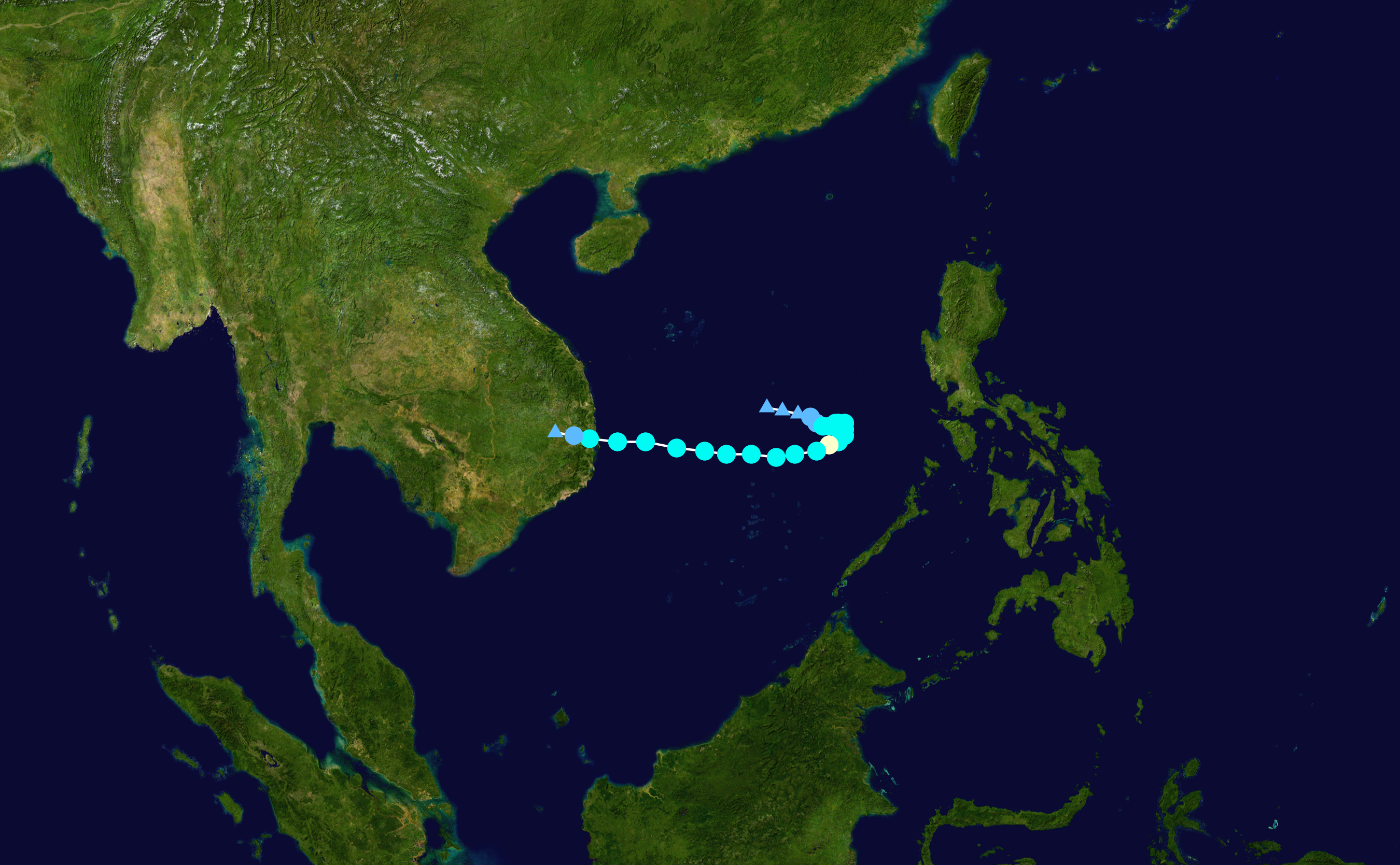
Storm path of Typhoon Nakri (Quiel)

- 00:00 UTC at 22.7°N 151.2°E – The JTWC reports that Typhoon Halong (24W) has weakened into a Category 3-equivalent typhoon on the SSHWS.
- 00:00 UTC at 13.2°N 116.9°E – The JMA reports that Tropical Storm Nakri (25W) has intensified into a severe tropical storm.
- 06:00 UTC at 23.9°N 151.5°E – The JMA reports that Typhoon Halong (24W) has weakened from a very strong typhoon into a typhoon.
- 06:00 UTC at 23.4°N 151.5°E – The JTWC reports that Typhoon Halong (24W) has weakened into a Category 2-equivalent typhoon on the SSHWS.
- 06:00 UTC at 13.4°N 117.3°E – The JTWC reports that Tropical Storm Nakri (25W) has reached a minimum barometric pressure of 982 hPa (29.00 inHg).
- 18:00 UTC at 25.6°N 153.0°E – The JTWC reports that Typhoon Halong (24W) has weakened into a Category 1-equivalent typhoon on the SSHWS.

==== November 8 ====
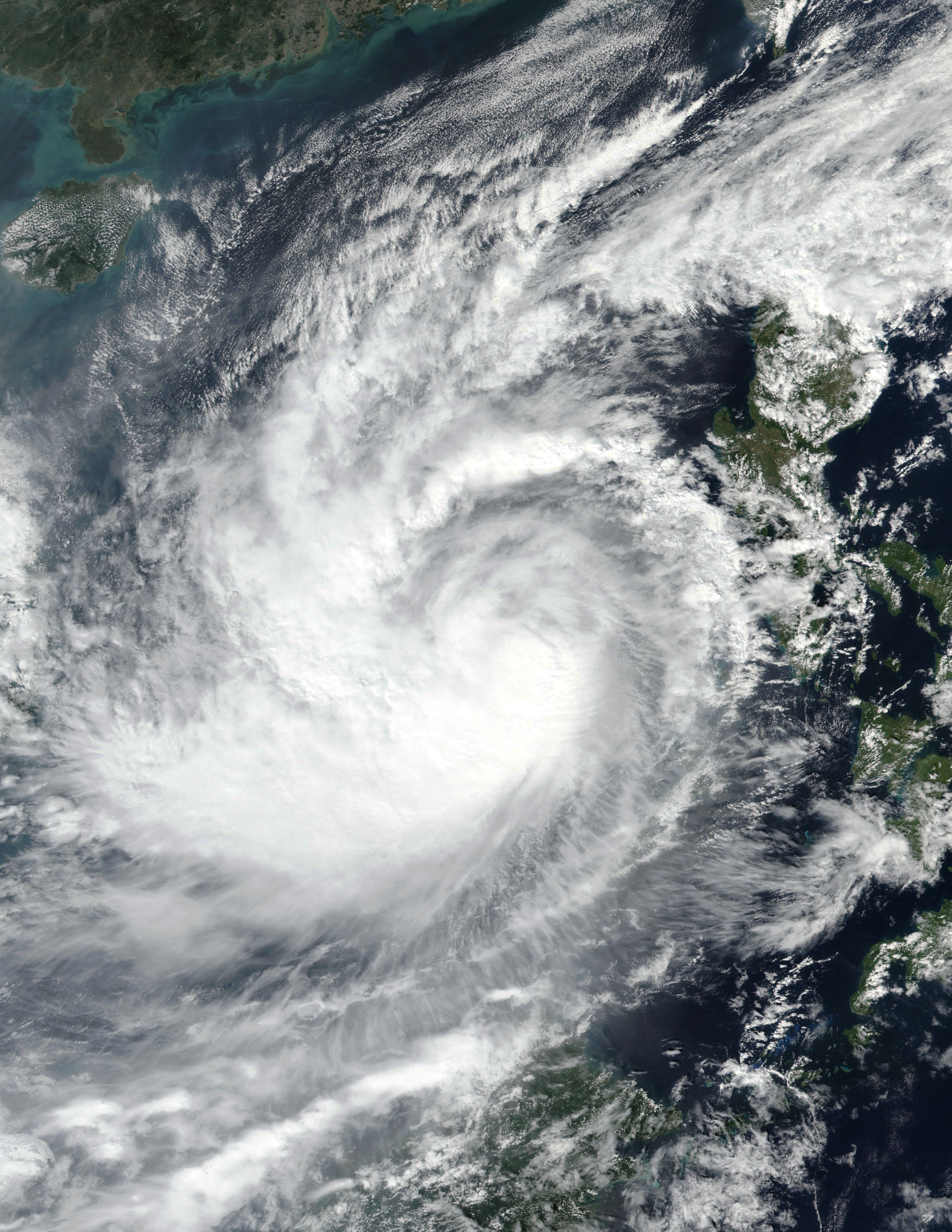
Satellite image of Typhoon Nakri at its peak intensity west of the Philippines on November 8

- 06:00 UTC at 28.1°N 157.0°E – The JMA reports that Typhoon Halong (24W) has weakened into a severe tropical storm.
- 06:00 UTC at 12.6°N 116.4°E – The JMA reports that Severe Tropical Storm Nakri (25W) has reached its peak intensity as a typhoon, estimating maximum sustained winds of 120 km/h (75 mph) and a minimum barometric pressure of 975 hPa (28.79 inHg).
- 06:00 UTC at 12.7°N 116.8°E – The JTWC reports that Tropical Storm Nakri (25W) has reached its peak winds as a Category 1-equivalent typhoon on the SSHWS, estimating maximum 1-minute sustained winds of 120 km/h (75 mph).
- 12:00 UTC at 29.6°N 158.6°E – The JMA reports that Severe Tropical Storm Halong (24W) has weakened into a tropical storm.
- 12:00 UTC at 29.4°N 158.0°E – The JTWC reports that Typhoon Halong (24W) has weakened into a tropical storm.
- 12:00 UTC at 12.5°N 116.4°E – The JTWC reports that Typhoon Nakri (25W) has weakened into a tropical storm.
- 18:00 UTC at 12.5°N 115.3°E – The JMA reports that Typhoon Nakri (25W) has weakened into a severe tropical storm.

==== November 9 ====
- 00:00 UTC at 31.2°N 160.8°E – The JMA reports that Tropical Storm Halong (24W) has transitioned into an extratropical cyclone.
- 02:00 UTC – The PAGASA reports that Severe Tropical Storm Nakri (25W) has exited the PAR.
- 12:00 UTC at 31.4°N 164.2°E – The JTWC reports that Tropical Storm Halong (24W) has weakened into a tropical depression.
- 18:00 UTC at 31.1°N 165.7°E – The JTWC reports that Tropical Depression Halong (24W) has transitioned into an extratropical cyclone.
- 18:00 UTC at 12.6°N 173.4°E – The JMA reports that a third tropical depression has formed.
- 18:00 UTC at 14.3°N 136.0°E – The JMA reports that a fourth tropical depression has formed.

==== November 10 ====
- 18:00 UTC at 12.8°N 109.5°E – The JMA reports that Severe Tropical Storm Nakri (25W) has weakened into a tropical storm.
- 18:00 UTC – Nakri (25W) makes landfall near Vạn Ninh District, Khánh Hòa Province, Vietnam.

==== November 11 ====
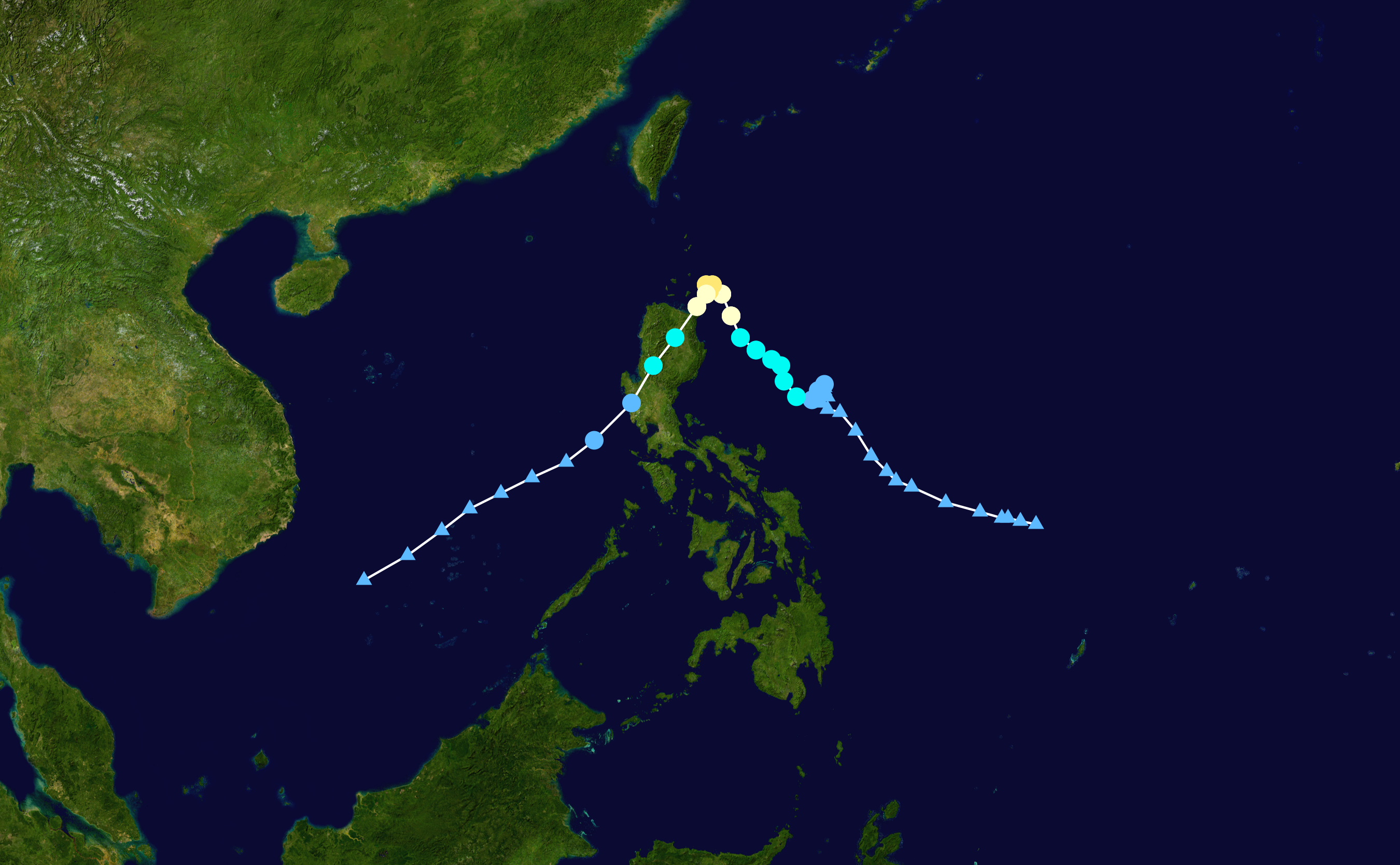
Storm path of Typhoon Kalmaegi (Ramon)

- 00:00 UTC at 13.0°N 109.0°E – The JMA reports that Tropical Storm Nakri (25W) has weakened into a tropical depression.
- 06:00 UTC at 13.3°N 107.8°E – The JMA last notes Tropical Depression Nakri (25W); it dissipates six hours later.
- 06:00 UTC at 13.1°N 108.0°E – The JTWC reports that Tropical Depression Nakri (25W) has weakened into a tropical disturbance.
- 06:00 UTC at 14.0°N 166.6°E – The JTWC begins tracking the third tropical depression, designating it 26W.
- 18:00 UTC at 12.6°N 132.7°E – The PAGASA reports that the fourth tropical depression has formed within the PAR, assigning it the local name Ramon.

==== November 12 ====
- 00:00 UTC at 14.8°N 162.5°E – The JMA reports that Tropical Depression 26W has intensified into a tropical storm, assigning it the name Fengshen.
- 12:00 UTC at 16.2°N 159.3°E – The JTWC reports that Tropical Depression Fengshen (26W) has intensified into a tropical storm.

==== November 13 ====
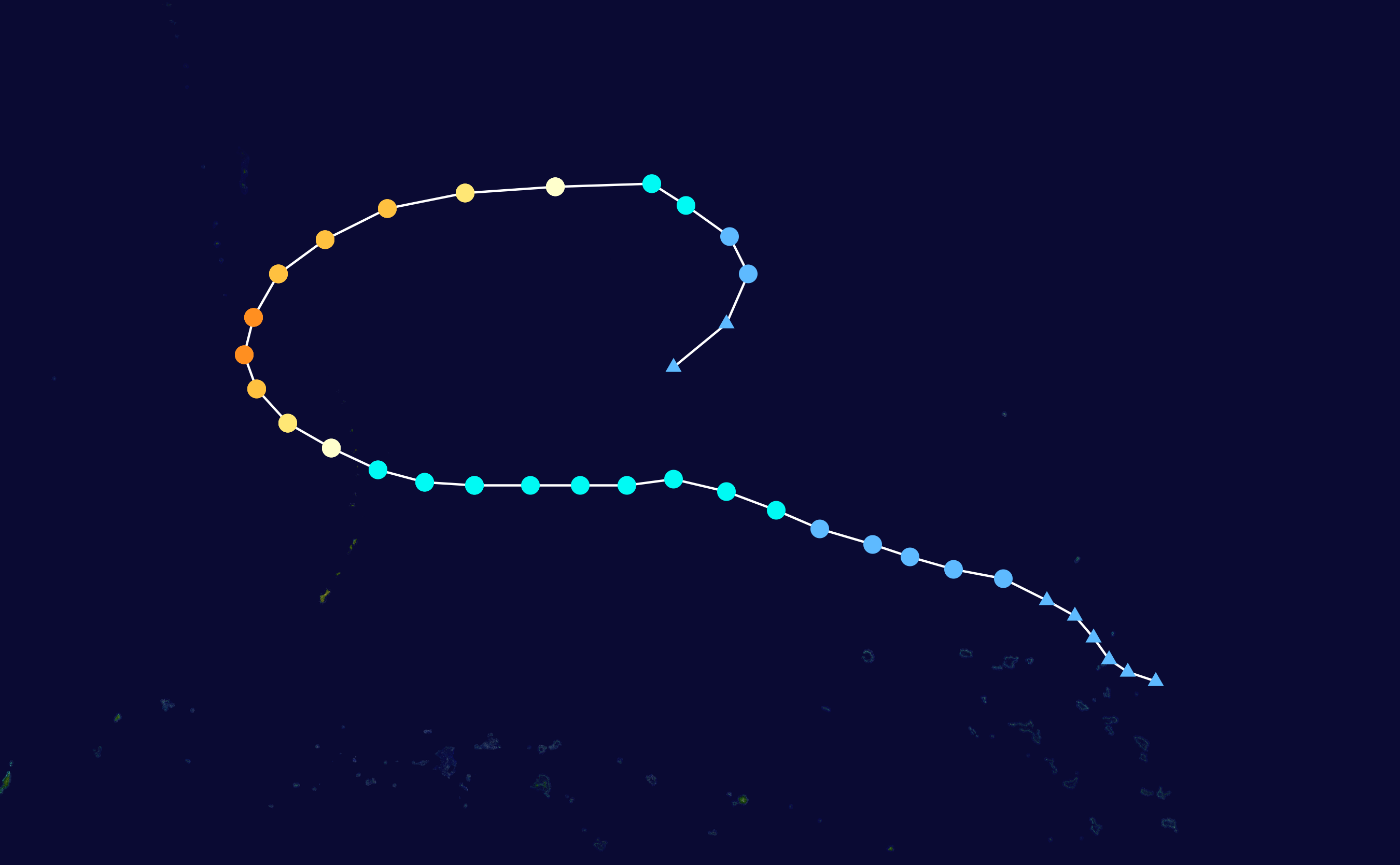
Storm path of Typhoon Fengshen

- 18:00 UTC at 16.7°N 151.8°E – The JMA reports that Tropical Storm Fengshen (26W) has intensified into a severe tropical storm.

==== November 14 ====
- 12:00 UTC at 16.4°N 127.6°E – The JMA reports that Tropical Depression Ramon has intensified into a tropical storm, assigning it the name Kalmaegi.
- 18:00 UTC at 18.2°N 145.0°E – The JTWC reports that Tropical Storm Fengshen (26W) has intensifed into a Category 1-equivalent typhoon on the SSHWS.

==== November 15 ====
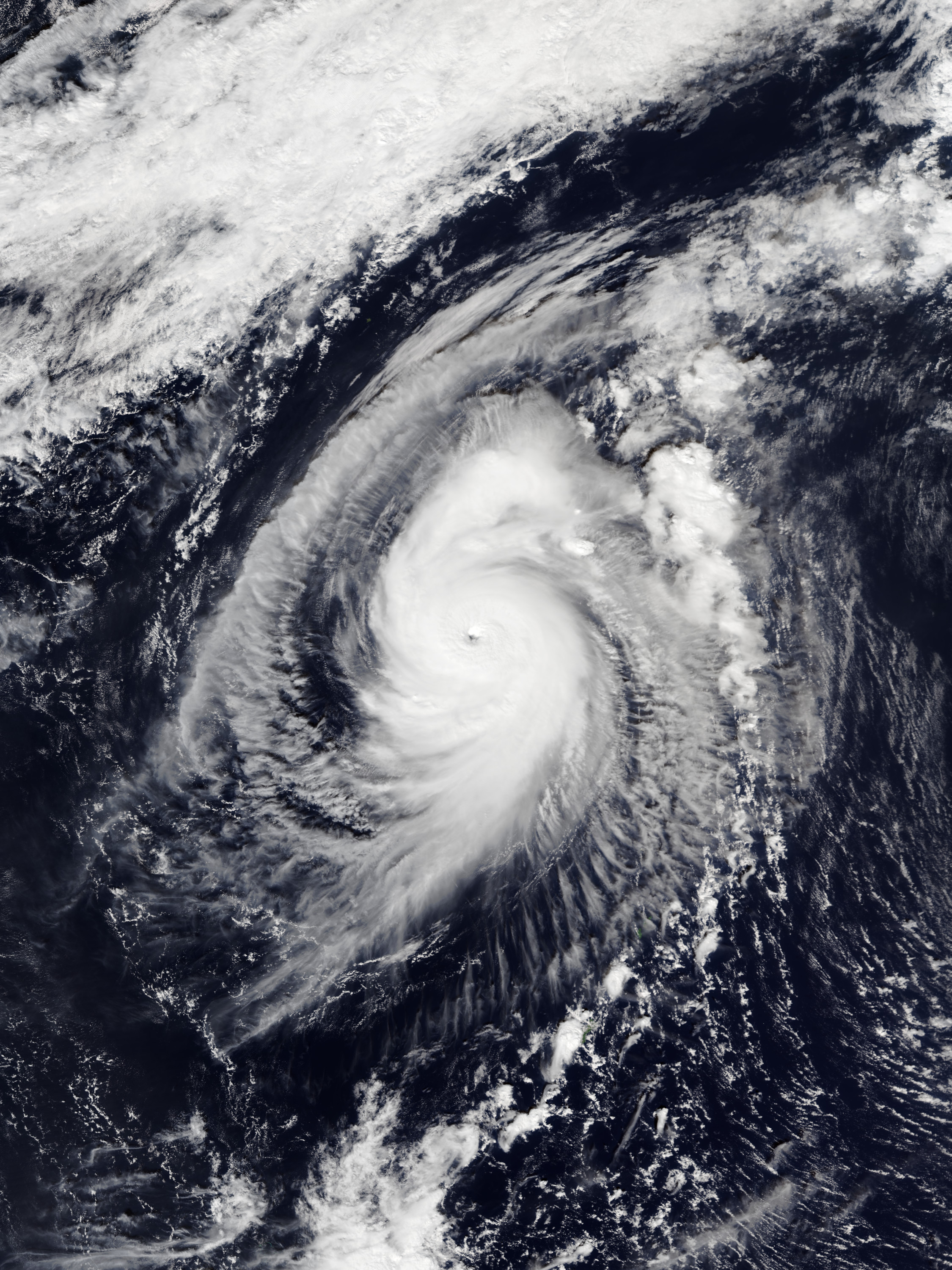
Satellite image of Typhoon Fengshen at its peak intensity on November 15

- 00:00 UTC at 19.1°N 143.7°E – The JMA reports that Severe Tropical Storm Fengshen has intensified into a typhoon.
- 00:00 UTC at 19.0°N 143.6°E – The JTWC reports that Typhoon Fengshen (26W) has intensifed into a Category 2-equivalent typhoon on the SSHWS.
- 06:00 UTC at 20.1°N 142.7°E – The JMA reports that Typhoon Fengshen has reached its peak intensity as a very strong typhoon, estimating maximum sustained winds of 155 km/h (100 mph) and a minimum barometric pressure of 965 hPa (28.50 inHg).
- 06:00 UTC at 20.1°N 142.6°E – The JTWC reports that Typhoon Fengshen (26W) has intensified into a Category 3-equivalent typhoon on the SSHWS.
- 12:00 UTC at 21.2°N 142.2°E – The JTWC reports that Typhoon Fengshen has reached its peak winds as a Category 4-equivalent typhoon on the SSHWS, estimating maximum 1-minute sustained winds of 215 km/h (130 mph).
- 18:00 UTC at 22.4°N 142.5°E – The JTWC reports that Typhoon Fengshen (26W) has reached a minimum barometric pressure of 946 hPa (27.94 inHg).
- 18:00 UTC at 16.0°N 126.3°E – The JTWC begins tracking Tropical Depression Kalmaegi, designating it 27W.

==== November 16 ====
- 00:00 UTC at 23.8°N 143.3°E – The JTWC reports that Typhoon Fengshen (26W) has weakened into a Category 3-equivalent typhoon on the SSHWS.
- 18:00 UTC at 26.6°N 149.2°E – The JMA reports that Typhoon Fengshen (26W) has weakened from a very strong typhoon into a typhoon.
- 18:00 UTC at 26.4°N 149.3°E – The JTWC reports that Typhoon Fengshen (26W) has weakened into a Category 2-equivalent typhoon on the SSHWS.
- 18:00 UTC at 15.6°N 125.4°E – The JTWC reports that Tropical Depression Kalmaegi (27W) has intensified into a tropical storm.

==== November 17 ====
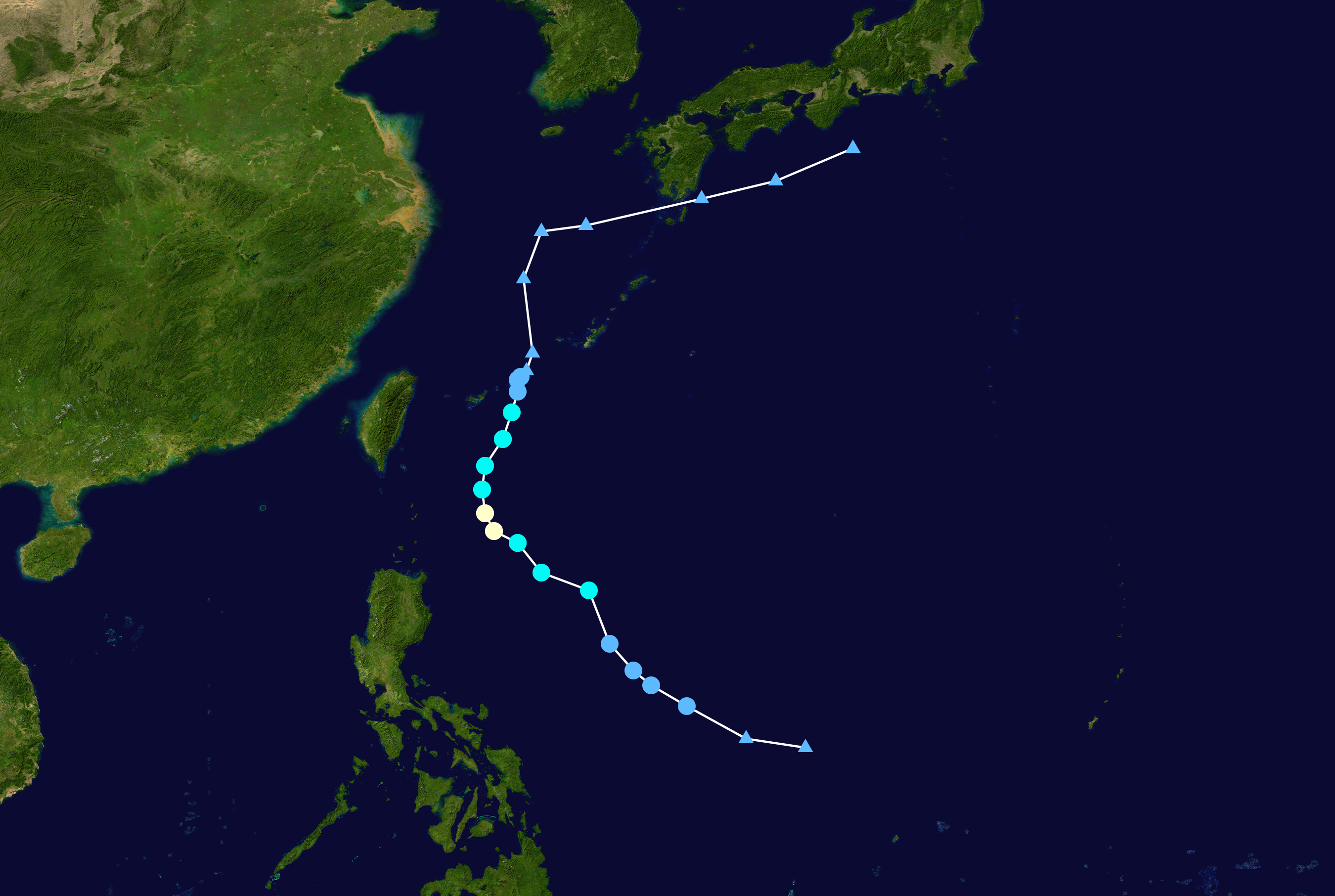
Storm path of Severe Tropical Storm Fung-wong (Sarah)

- 00:00 UTC at 26.6°N 152.2°E – The JTWC reports that Typhoon Fengshen (26W) has weakened into a Category 1-equivalent typhoon on the SSHWS.
- 06:00 UTC at 26.9°N 155.2°E – The JMA reports that Typhoon Fengshen (26W) has weakened into a severe tropical storm.
- 06:00 UTC at 26.7°N 155.3°E – The JTWC reports that Typhoon Fengshen (26W) has weakened into a tropical storm.
- 12:00 UTC at 26.2°N 156.7°E – The JMA reports that Severe Tropical Storm Fengshen (26W) has transitioned into an extratropical cyclone.
- 12:00 UTC at 10.6°N 143.6°E – The JMA reports that a fifth tropical depression has formed.
- 18:00 UTC at 25.0°N 157.8°E – The JTWC reports that Tropical Storm Fengshen (26W) has weakened into a tropical depression.

==== November 18 ====
- 00:00 UTC at 17.6°N 123.3°E – The JMA reports that Tropical Storm Kalmaegi (27W) has intensified into a severe tropical storm.
- 06:00 UTC at 22.2°N 157.7°E – The JTWC reports that Tropical Depression Fengshen (26W) has weakened into a tropical disturbance.
- 06:00 UTC at 18.2°N 123.3°E – The JTWC reports that Tropical Storm Kalmaegi (27W) has intensified into a Category 1-equivalent typhoon on the SSHWS.
- 12:00 UTC at 18.8°N 122.9°E – The JMA reports that Severe Tropical Storm Kalmaegi (27W) has intensified into a typhoon.
- 18:00 UTC at 19.1°N 122.7°E – The JMA reports that Typhoon Kalmaegi (27W) has reached its peak intensity, estimating maximum sustained winds of 130 km/h (80 mph) and a minimum barometric pressure of 975 hPa (28.79 inHg).
- 18:00 UTC at 19.0°N 122.6°E – The JTWC reports that Typhoon Kalmaegi (27W) has intensified into a Category 2-equivalent typhoon on the SSHWS.

==== November 19 ====
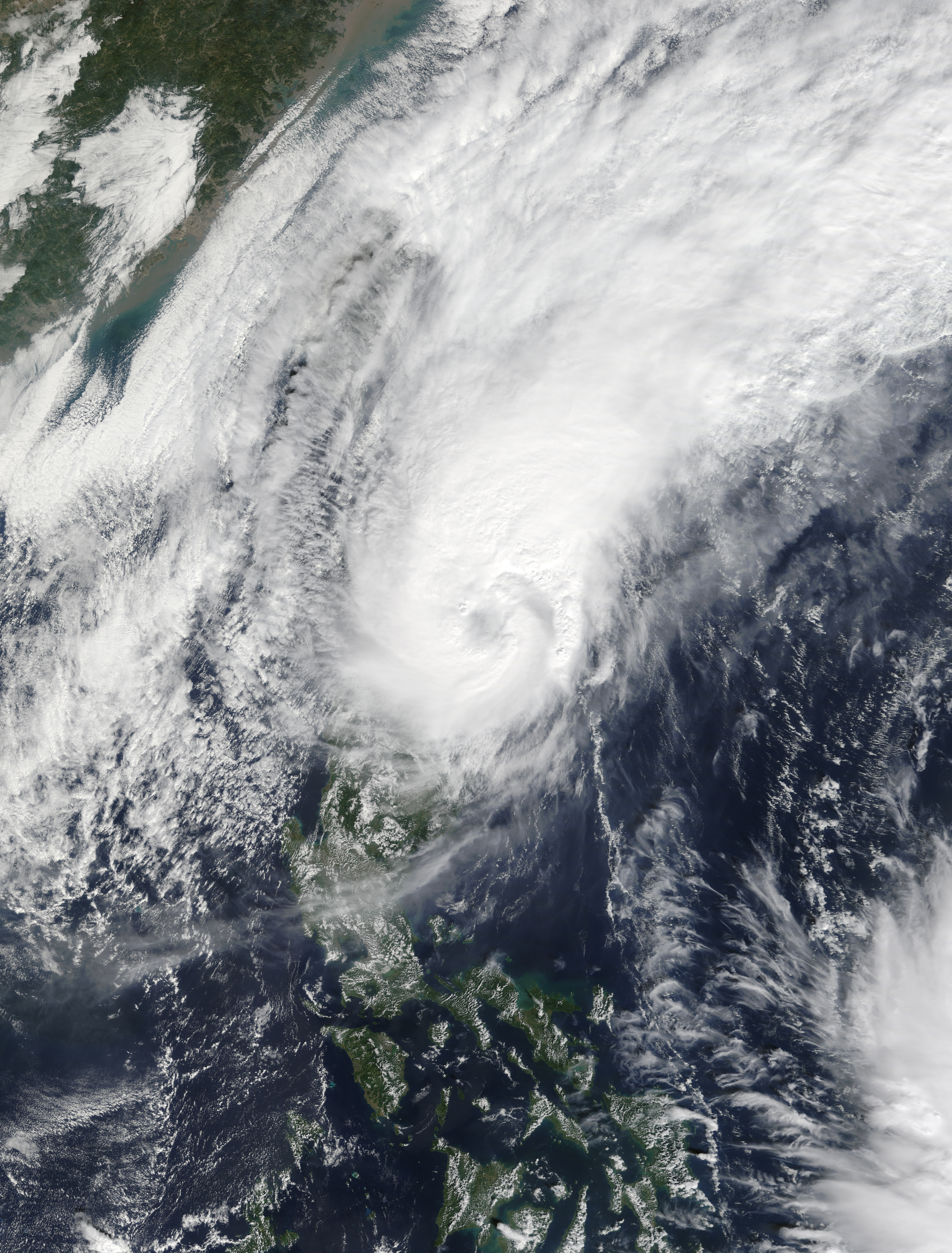
Satellite image of Typhoon Kalmaegi at its peak intensity northeast of the Philippines on November 19

- 00:00 UTC at 19.2°N 122.5°E – The JTWC reports that Typhoon Kalmaegi (27W) has reached its peak intensity, estimating maximum 1-minute sustained winds of 165 km/h (105 mph) and a minimum barometric pressure of 963 hPa (28.44 inHg).
- 00:00 UTC at 13.0°N 132.9°E – The PAGASA reports that the fifth tropical depression has formed within the PAR, assigning it the local name Sarah.
- 06:00 UTC at 14.0°N 131.1°E – The JTWC begins tracking Tropical Depression Sarah, designating it 28W.
- 12:00 UTC at 18.9°N 122.5°E – The JTWC reports that Typhoon Kalmaegi (27W) has weakened into a Category 1-equivalent typhoon on the SSHWS.
- 16:20 UTC – Kalmaegi (27W) makes landfall near Santa Ana, Cagayan in the Philippines.
- 18:00 UTC at 18.4°N 122.1°E – The JMA reports that Typhoon Kalmaegi (27W) has weakened into a tropical storm, skipping severe tropical storm status.

==== November 20 ====
- 00:00 UTC at 17.4°N 121.7°E – The JMA reports that Tropical Storm Kalmaegi (27W) has weakened into a tropical depression.
- 00:00 UTC at 17.5°N 121.5°E – The JTWC reports that Typhoon Kalmaegi (27W) has weakened into a tropical storm.
- 00:00 UTC at 16.1°N 128.2°E – The JMA reports that Tropical Depression 28W (Sarah) has intensified into a tropical storm, assigning it the name Fung-wong.
- 06:00 UTC at 17.9°N 127.8°E – The JTWC reports that Tropical Depression Fung-wong (28W) has intensified into a tropical storm.
- 12:00 UTC at 15.4°N 120.1°E – The JTWC reports that Tropical Storm Kalmaegi (27W) has weakened into a tropical depression.
- 18:00 UTC at 19.6°N 125.4°E – The JMA reports that Tropical Storm Fung-wong (28W) has intensified into a severe tropical storm.

==== November 21 ====
- 00:00 UTC at 13.5°N 118.0°E – The JTWC reports that Tropical Depression Kalmaegi (27W) has weakened into a tropical disturbance.
- 00:00 UTC at 20.2°N 125.0°E – The JMA reports that Severe Tropical Storm Fung-wong (28W) has reached its peak intensity, estimating maximum sustained winds of 100 km/h (65 mph) and a minimum barometric pressure 990 hPa (29.23 inHg).
- 00:00 UTC at 19.9°N 124.6°E – The JTWC reports that Tropical Storm Fung-wong (28W) has reached its peak intensity as a Category 1-equivalent typhoon on the SSHWS, estimating maximum 1-minute sustained winds of 120 km/h (75 mph) and a minimum barometric pressure of 988 hPa (29.18 inHg).
- 12:00 UTC at 21.3°N 124.2°E – The JTWC reports that Typhoon Fung-wong (28W) has weakened into a tropical storm.

==== November 22 ====
- 00:00 UTC at 11.4°N 114.0°E – The JMA last notes Tropical Depression Kalmaegi; it dissipates six hours later.
- 00:00 UTC at 22.9°N 125.0°E – The JMA reports that Severe Tropical Storm Fung-wong (28W) has weakened into a tropical storm.
- 12:00 UTC at 24.6°N 125.3°E – The JMA reports that Tropical Storm Fung-wong (28W) has weakened into a tropical depression.
- 12:00 UTC at 24.6°N 125.4°E – The JTWC reports that Tropical Storm Fung-wong (28W) has weakened into a tropical depression.
- 13:10 UTC – Fung-wong (28W) makes landfall near Miyako Island, Ryukyu Islands, Japan.
- 18:00 UTC – The PAGASA reports that Tropical Depression Fung-wong (28W) has exited the PAR.

==== November 23 ====
- 06:00 UTC at 25.3°N 125.7°E – The JTWC reports that Tropical Depression Fung-wong (28W) has weakened into a tropical disturbance.
- 18:00 UTC at 28.4°N 125.6°E – The JMA reports that Tropical Depression Fung-wong (28W) has transitioned into an extratropical cyclone.

==== November 24 ====
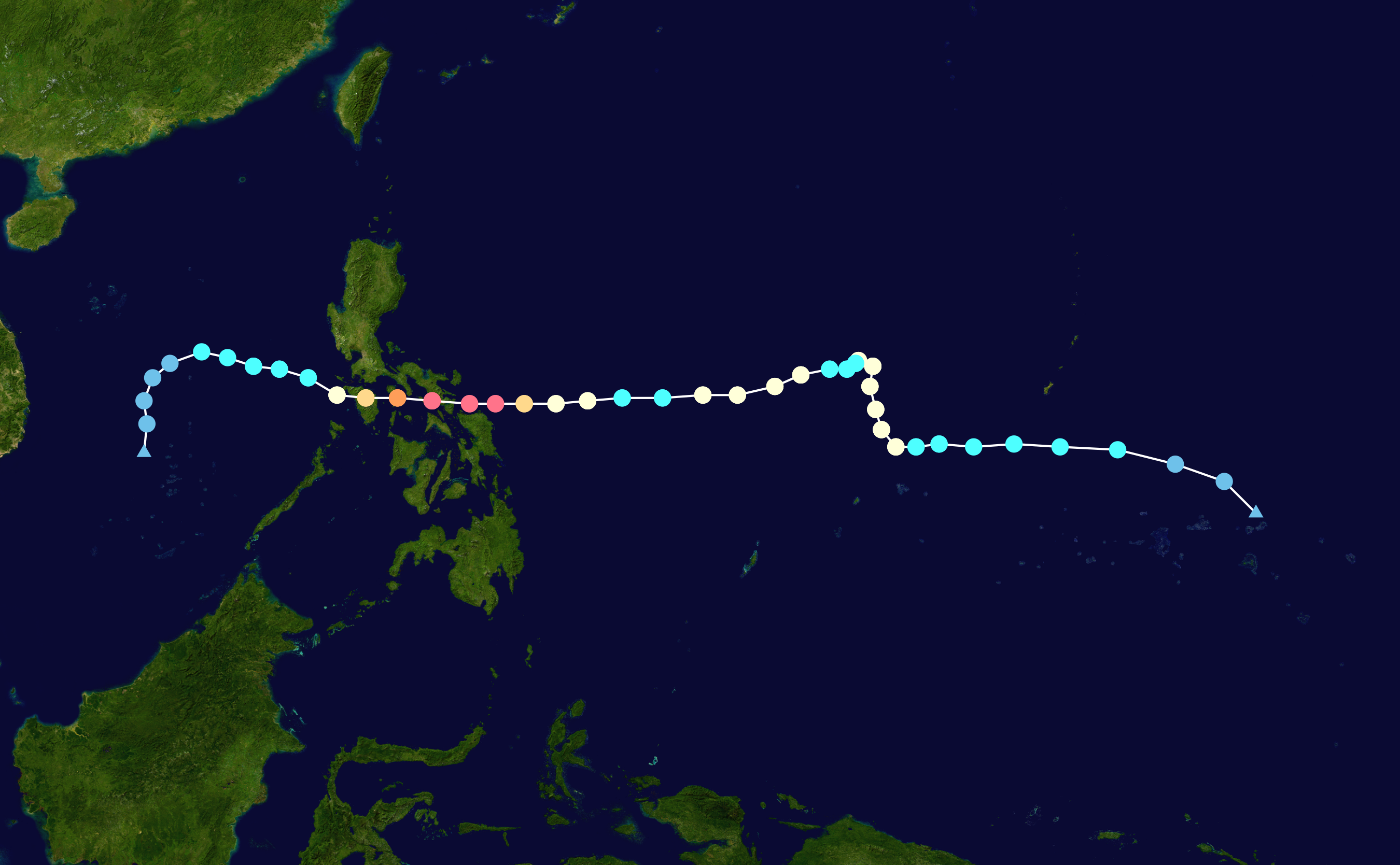
Storm path of Typhoon Kammuri (Tisoy)

- 12:00 UTC at 8.6°N 159.7°E – The JMA reports that a sixth tropical depression has formed.

==== November 25 ====
- 18:00 UTC at 10.2°N 150.9°E – The JTWC begins tracking the sixth tropical depression, designating it 29W.

==== November 26 ====
- 00:00 UTC at 10.7°N 149.2°E – The JMA reports that Tropical Depression 29W has intensified into a tropical storm, assigning it the name Kammuri.
- 06:00 UTC at 11.3°N 147.2°E – The JTWC reports that Tropical Depression Kammuri (29W) has intensified into a tropical storm.

==== November 27 ====
- 00:00 UTC at 11.3°N 142.1°E – The JMA reports that Tropical Storm Kammuri (29W) has intensified into a severe tropical storm.
- 00:00 UTC at 14.4°N 149.7°E – The JMA reports that a seventh tropical depression has formed.
- 06:00 UTC at 15.4°N 146.9°E – The JMA reports that the seventh tropical depression has reached its peak intensity, estimating maximum sustained winds of 55 km/h (35 mph) and a minimum barometric pressure of 1,002 hPa (29.59 inHg).
- 18:00 UTC at 11.4°N 139.5°E – The JTWC reports that Tropical Storm Kammuri (29W) has intensified into a Category 1-equivalent typhoon on the SSHWS.

==== November 28 ====
- 00:00 UTC at 11.9°N 138.8°E – The JMA reports that Severe Tropical Storm Kammuri (29W) has intensified into a typhoon.
- 06:00 UTC at 18.2°N 141.9°E – The JMA last notes the seventh tropical depression.

==== November 29 ====
- 06:00 UTC at 14.3°N 138.1°E – The JTWC reports that Typhoon Kammuri (29W) has weakened into a tropical storm.
- 06:00 UTC at 7.0°N 157.0°E – The JMA reports that an eighth tropical depression has formed.

==== November 30 ====
- 00:00 UTC at 13.9°N 136.2°E – The JTWC reports that Tropical Storm Kammuri (29W) has intensified into a Category 1-equivalent typhoon on the SSHWS.
- 05:00 UTC – The PAGASA reports that Typhoon Kammuri (29W) has entered the PAR, assigning it the local name Tisoy.
- 06:00 UTC at 7.2°N 155.3°E – The JMA reports that the eighth tropical depression has reached its peak intensity, estimating maximum susatined winds of 55 km/h (35 mph) and a minimum barometric pressure of 1,002 hPa (29.59 inHg).

=== December ===
==== December 1 ====
- 00:00 UTC at 13.1°N 131.4°E – The JTWC reports that Typhoon Kammuri (29W) has weakened into a tropical storm.
- 12:00 UTC at 13.0°N 128.8°E – The JTWC reports that Tropical Storm Kammuri (29W) has intensified into a Category 1-equivalent typhoon on the SSHWS.
- 18:00 UTC at 7.0°N 152.0°E – The JMA last notes the eighth tropical depression of November.

==== December 2 ====
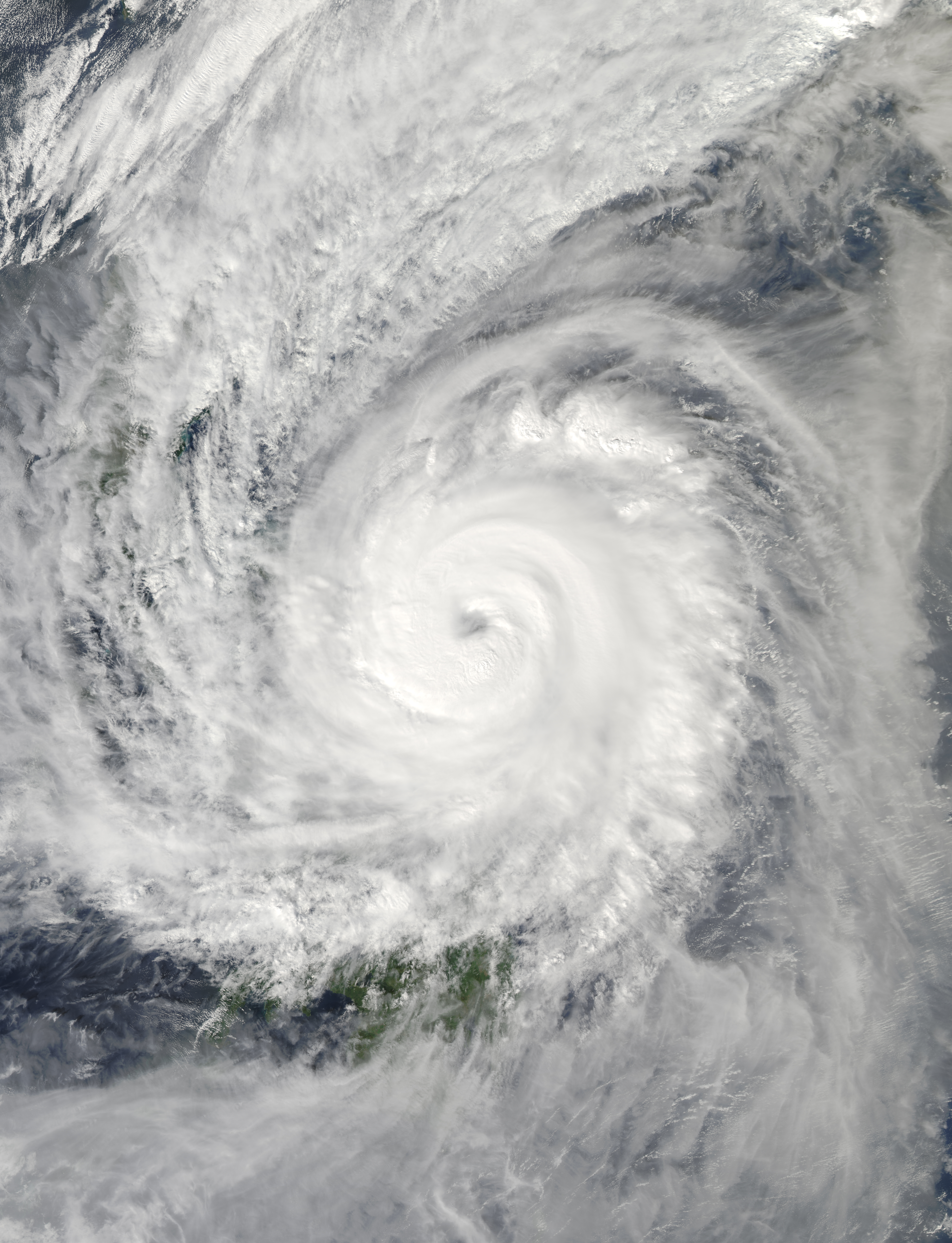
Satellite image of Typhoon Kammuri near its peak intensity on December 2

- 00:00 UTC at 12.9°N 126.6°E – The JTWC reports that Typhoon Kammuri (29W) has intensified into a Category 2-equivalent typhoon on the SSHWS.
- 06:00 UTC at 13.0°N 125.6°E – The JMA reports that Typhoon Kammuri (29W) has intensified into a very strong typhoon.
- 06:00 UTC at 12.9°N 125.6°E – The JTWC reports that Typhoon Kammuri (29W) has intensified into a Category 4-equivalent typhoon on the SSHWS, skipping Category 3-equivalent status.
- 12:00 UTC at 12.9°N 124.7°E – The JMA reports that Typhoon Kammuri (29W) has reached its peak intensity, estimating maximum sustained winds of 165 km/h (105 mph) and a minimum barometric pressure of 950 hPa (28.05 inHg).
- 12:00 UTC at 12.9°N 124.7°E – The JTWC reports that Typhoon Kammuri (29W) has reached its peak intensity, estimating maximum 1-minute sustained winds of 220 km/h (140 mph) and a minimum barometric pressure of 938 hPa (27.70 inHg).
- 15:00 UTC – Kammuri (29W) makes its first landfall near Gubat, Sorsogon in the Philippines.
- 20:00 UTC – Kammuri (29W) makes its second landfall near San Pascual, Masbate in the Philippines.

==== December 3 ====
- 00:00 UTC at 13.2°N 122.2°E – The JMA reports that Typhoon Kammuri has weakened from a very strong typhoon into a typhoon.
- 00:00 UTC at 13.1°N 122.2°E – The JTWC reports that Typhoon Kammuri (29W) has weakened into a Category 3-equivalent typhoon on the SSHWS.
- 00:30 UTC – Kammuri (29W) makes its third landfall near Torrijos, Marinduque in the Philippines.
- 04:30 UTC – Kammuri (29W) makes its fourth and final landfall near Naujan, Oriental Mindoro in the Philippines.
- 06:00 UTC at 13.1°N 121.1°E – The JTWC reports that Typhoon Kammuri (29W) has weakened into a Category 2-equivalent typhoon on the SSHWS.
- 12:00 UTC at 13.2°N 120.1°E – The JTWC reports that Typhoon Kammuri (29W) has weakened into a Category 1-equivalent typhoon on the SSHWS.
- 18:00 UTC at 13.7°N 118.6°E – The JMA reports that Typhoon Kammuri (29W) has weakened into a severe tropical storm.
- 18:00 UTC at 13.8°N 119.1°E – The JTWC reports that Typhoon Kammuri (29W) has weakened into a tropical storm.

==== December 4 ====
- 12:00 UTC at 14.2°N 116.1°E – The JMA reports that Severe Tropical Storm Kammuri (29W) has weakened into a tropical storm.
- 20:00 UTC – The PAGASA reports that Tropical Storm Kammuri (29W) has exited the PAR.

==== December 5 ====
- 00:00 UTC at 14.3°N 114.3°E – The JTWC reports that Tropical Storm Kammuri (29W) has weakened into a tropical depression.
- 18:00 UTC at 12.4°N 112.9°E – The JMA reports that Tropical Storm Kammuri (29W) has weakened into a tropical depression.

==== December 6 ====
- 00:00 UTC at 11.4°N 112.9°E – The JMA last notes Tropical Depression Kammuri (29W); it dissipates six hours later.
- 00:00 UTC at 11.2°N 113.4°E – The JTWC reports that Tropical Depression Kammuri (29W) has weakened into a tropical disturbance.

==== December 19 ====
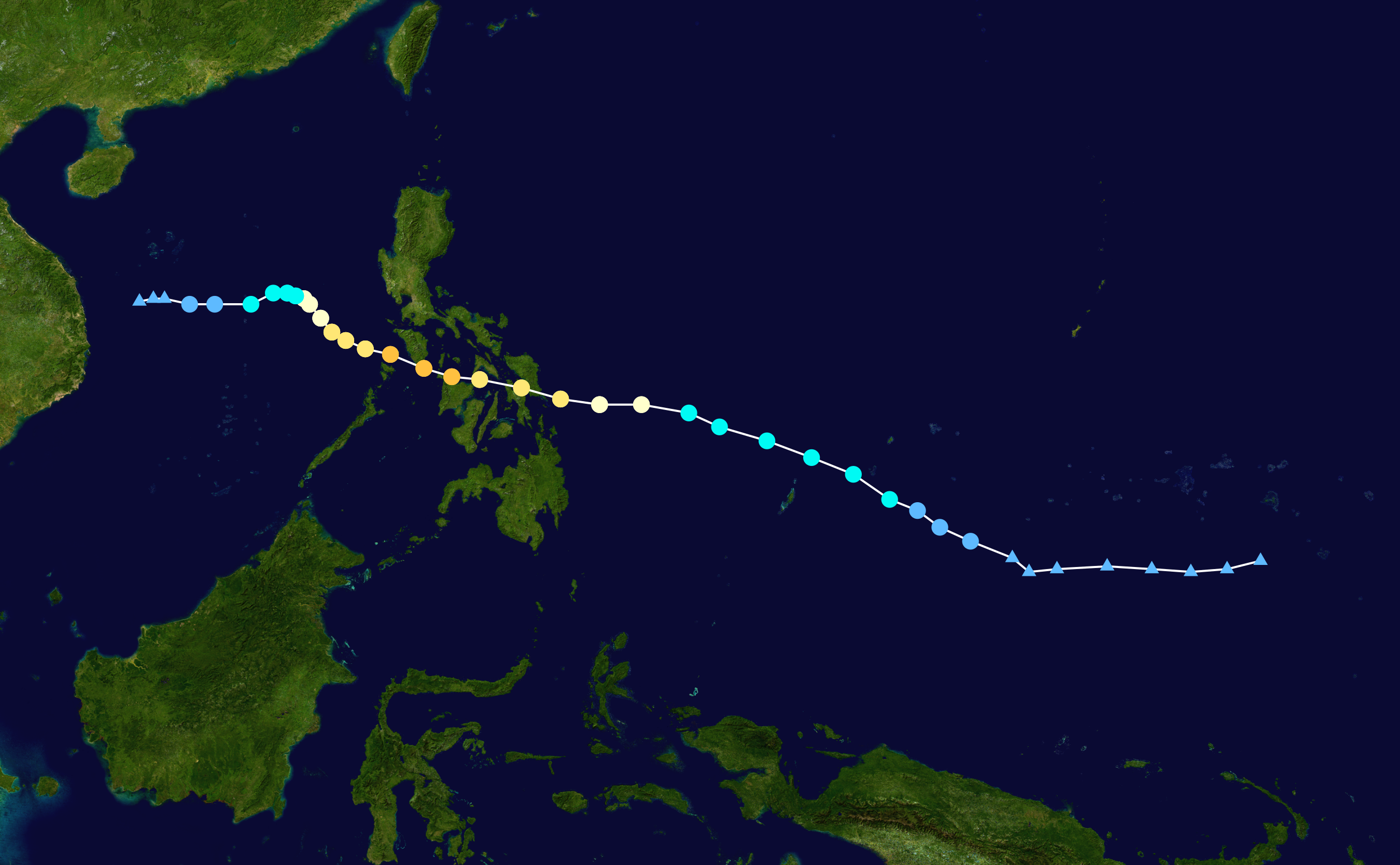
Storm path of Typhoon Phanfone (Ursula)

- 12:00 UTC at 4.7°N 151.4°E – The JMA reports that the first and only tropical depression of the month has formed.

==== December 21 ====
- 12:00 UTC at 5.9°N 141.0°E – The JTWC begins tracking the first tropical depression, designating it 30W.

==== December 22 ====
- 01:00 UTC – The PAGASA reports that Tropical Depression 30W has entered the PAR, assigning it the local name Ursula.
- 06:00 UTC at 7.4°N 138.1°E – The JTWC reports that Tropical Depression 30W (Ursula) has intensified into a tropical storm.
- 12:00 UTC at 8.7°N 136.9°E – The JMA reports that Tropical Depression 30W (Ursula) has intensified into a tropical storm, assigning it the name Phanfone.

==== December 23 ====
- 12:00 UTC at 10.4°N 130.7°E – The JMA reports that Tropical Storm Phanfone (30W) has intensified into a severe tropical storm.
- 18:00 UTC at 10.8°N 129.2°E – The JTWC reports that Tropical Storm Phanfone (30W) has intensified into a Category 1-equivalent typhoon on the SSHWS.

==== December 24 ====
- 00:00 UTC at 10.6°N 127.8°E – The JMA reports that Severe Tropical Storm Phanfone (30W) has intensified into a typhoon.
- 06:00 UTC at 11.0°N 126.3°E – The JTWC reports that Typhoon Phanfone (30W) has intensified into a Category 2-equivalent typhoon on the SSHWS.
- 08:45 UTC – Phanfone (30W) makes its first landfall near Salcedo, Eastern Samar in the Philippines.
- 18:00 UTC at 11.8°N 123.4°E – The JMA reports that Typhoon Phanfone (30W) has reached its peak intensity, estimating maximum sustained winds of 150 km/h (90 mph) and a minimum barometric pressure of 970 hPa (28.64 inHg).
- 18:30 UTC – Phanfone (30W) makes its second landfall near Carles, Iloilo in the Philippines.

==== December 25 ====
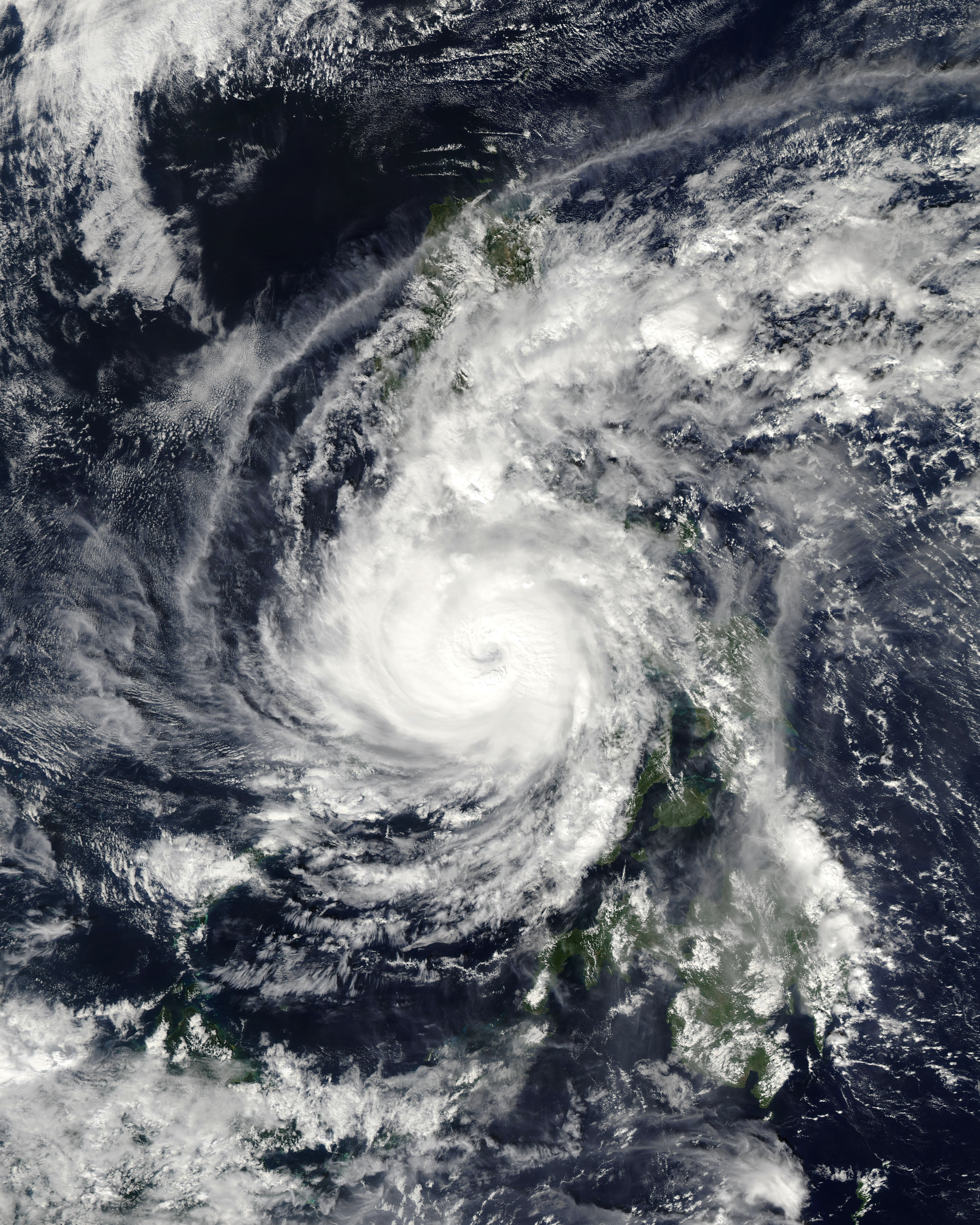
Satellite image of Typhoon Phanfone at its peak intensity while passing through the Philippines on December 25

- 00:00 UTC at 11.8°N 122.4°E – The JTWC reports that Typhoon Phanfone (30W) has reached its peak intensity as a Category 3-equivalent typhoon on the SSHWS, estimating maximum 1-minute sustained winds of 195 km/h (120 mph) and a minimum barometric pressure of 958 hPa (28.29 inHg).
- 00:40 UTC – Phanfone (30W) makes its third landfall near Ibajay, Aklan in the Philippines.
- 05:00 UTC – Phanfone (30W) makes its fourth landfall near Caluya, Antique in the Philippines.
- 07:00 UTC – Phanfone (30W) makes its fifth and final landfall near Bulalacao, Oriental Mindoro in the Philippines.
- 18:00 UTC at 12.8°N 119.3°E – The JMA reports that Typhoon Phanfone (30W) has weakened into a severe tropical storm.
- 18:00 UTC at 12.8°N 119.3°E – The JTWC reports that Typhoon Phanfone (30W) has weakened into a Category 2-equivalent typhoon on the SSHWS.

==== December 26 ====
- 00:00 UTC at 13.1°N 118.6°E – The JMA reports that Severe Tropical Storm Phanfone (30W) has intensified into a typhoon.
- 06:00 UTC at 13.4°N 118.0°E – The JMA reports that Typhoon Phanfone (30W) has reached its secondary peak intensity, estimating maximum sustained winds of 140 km/h (85 mph) and a minimum barometric pressure of 975 hPa (28.79 inHg).
- 12:00 UTC at 13.9°N 117.7°E – The JTWC reports that Typhoon Phanfone (30W) has weakened into a Category 1-equivalent typhoon on the SSHWS.
- 18:00 UTC at 14.3°N 117.2°E – The JMA reports that Typhoon Phanfone (30W) has weakened into a severe tropical storm.

==== December 27 ====
- 06:00 UTC at 14.7°N 116.8°E – The JTWC reports that Typhoon Phanfone (30W) has weakened into a tropical storm.
- 12:00 UTC at 14.6°N 116.0°E – The JMA reports that Severe Tropical Storm Phanfone (30W) has weakened into a tropical storm.

==== December 28 ====
- 00:00 UTC at 14.4°N 115.2°E – The JMA reports that Tropical Storm Phanfone (30W) has weakened into a tropical depression.
- 01:50 UTC – The PAGASA reports that Tropical Storm Phanfone (30W) has exited the PAR.
- 06:00 UTC at 14.4°N 113.9°E – The JTWC reports that Tropical Storm Phanfone (30W) has weakened into a tropical depression.
- 18:00 UTC at 14.6°N 112.1°E – The JTWC reports that Tropical Depression Phanfone (30W) has weakened into a tropical disturbance.

==== December 29 ====
- 00:00 UTC at 14.3°N 111.7°E – The JMA last notes Tropical Depression Phanfone (30W); it dissipates six hours later.

== See also ==
- Timeline of the 2019 Atlantic hurricane season
- Timeline of the 2019 Pacific hurricane season
- Timeline of the 2019 North Indian Ocean cyclone season
- List of Pacific typhoons
- Pacific typhoon season
- Tropical cyclones in 2019
