= Outline of tropical cyclones =

Overview of and topical guide to tropical cyclones

The following outline is provided as an overview of and topical guide to tropical cyclones:

Tropical cyclone – storm characterized by a large low-pressure center and numerous thunderstorms that produces strong winds and heavy rain. Tropical cyclones develop or strengthen when water evaporated from the ocean is released as the saturated air rises, resulting in condensation of water vapor contained in the moist air. They are fueled by a different heat mechanism than other cyclonic windstorms such as nor'easters, European windstorms, and polar lows. The characteristic that separates tropical cyclones from other cyclonic systems is that at any height in the atmosphere, the center of a tropical cyclone will be warmer than its surroundings; a phenomenon called "warm core" storm systems.

== Nature of tropical cyclones ==
Tropical cyclones can be described as all of the following:

- Storm – disturbed state of an environment or astronomical body's atmosphere especially affecting its surface, and strongly implying severe weather. It may be marked by significant disruptions to normal conditions such as strong wind, hail, thunder and lightning (a thunderstorm), heavy precipitation (snowstorm, rainstorm), heavy freezing rain (ice storm), strong winds (tropical cyclone, windstorm), or wind transporting some substance through the atmosphere such as sand or debris.
- Natural disaster – major adverse event resulting from natural processes of the Earth; examples include floods, volcanic eruptions, earthquakes, tsunamis, and other geologic processes. A natural disaster can cause loss of life or property damage, and typically leaves some economic damage in its wake, the severity of which depends on the affected population's resilience, or ability to recover.

== Types of tropical cyclones ==
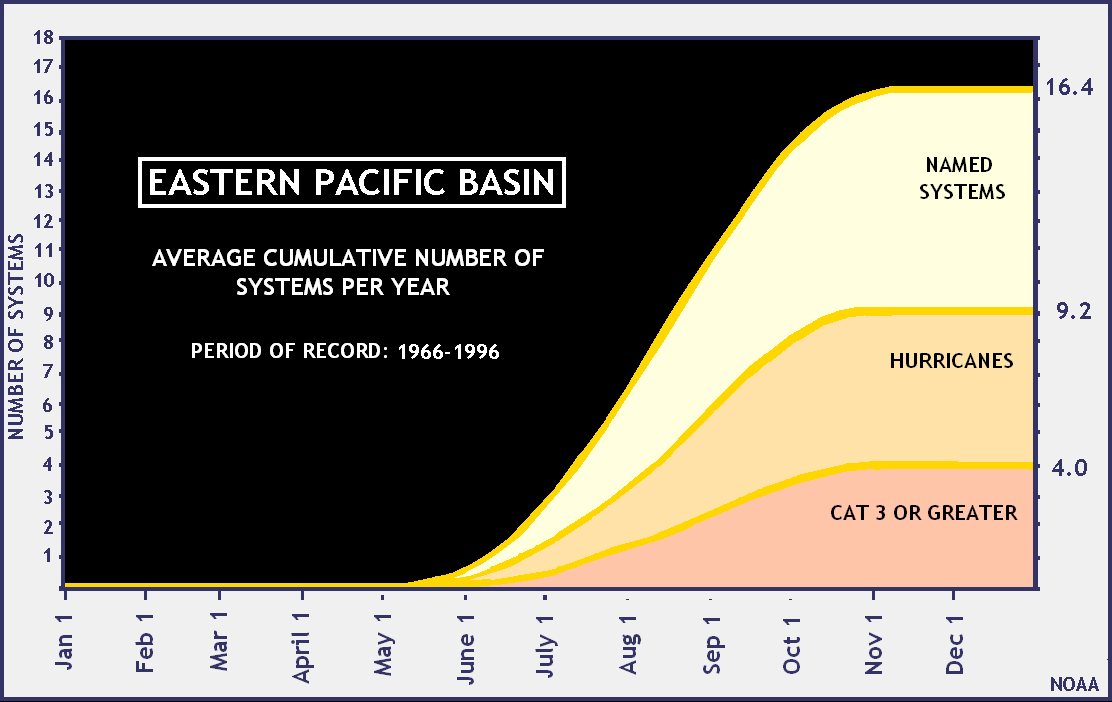
Cumulative graph of tropical cyclones in the eastern Pacific

Terminology for tropical cyclones on a world map

- Tropical cyclone – a rapidly rotating low-pressure system consisting of a spiral band of thunderstorms, strong winds, and atmospheric circulation that can produce heavy rain and squalls. Depending on the location, they are given different names such as hurricanes, cyclones, or typhoons.
- Annular tropical cyclone – a tropical cyclone that possesses annular characteristics. Annular characteristics are often seen in major cyclones, where they possess a symmetrical eye and a thick ring of convection.
- Subtropical cyclone – a low-pressure system that gains both tropical and extratropical-like quantities.
- Extratropical cyclone – a low-pressure system that is capable of producing weather conditions such as tornadoes, thunderstorms, gales, etc.
- Post-tropical cyclone – a former tropical cyclone that no longer has enough tropical quantities to be considered a tropical cyclone. Post-tropical cyclones, such as remnant lows, no longer possess tropical quantities through either unfavorable conditions (e.g. increased wind shear) or land interaction.
- Pacific hurricane – a tropical cyclone that forms west of 100°W to the International Date Line in the Northern Hemisphere. The National Hurricane Center is responsible for the region east of 140°W, while the Central Pacific Hurricane Center is responsible for storms forming west of 140°W to the International Date Line.
- Atlantic hurricane – a tropical cyclone that forms in the Atlantic Ocean. The National Hurricane Center is responsible for the region.
- Typhoon – a tropical cyclone that forms between the International Date Line and 100°E in the Northern Hemisphere. The main RSMC for this region is the Japan Meteorological Agency.
- Mediterranean tropical-like cyclone – a tropical cyclone that forms in the Mediterranean Sea.
- Cape Verde hurricane – a tropical cyclone that forms from a tropical wave over or near the Cape Verde islands. Cape Verde hurricanes occur between August and October and contain some of the most destructive hurricanes to strike land in the Atlantic. Examples include Hurricane Ivan, Hurricane Isabel, Hurricane Dorian, etc.
- Tropical wave – an atmospheric trough or low-pressure area that forms along the subtropical ridge or supported from an area of high pressure, which lies either north or south of the Intertropical Convergence Zone.

== Tropical cyclone observations ==
Saffir–Simpson scale, 1-minute maximum sustained winds
Category	m/s	knots	mph	km/h
5	≥ 70	≥ 137	≥ 157	≥ 252
4	58–70	113–136	130–156	209–251
3	50–58	96–112	111–129	178–208
2	43–49	83–95	96–110	154–177
1	33–42	64–82	74–95	119–153
TS	18–32	34–63	39–73	63–118
TD	≤ 17	≤ 33	≤ 38	≤ 62

- Tropical cyclone scales – used to determine a cyclone's intensity, longetivity, and strength throughout its lifetime.
  - Saffir-Simpson Hurricane Scale – a scale widely used by the National Hurricane Center, Central Pacific Hurricane Center, and the Joint Typhoon Warning Center to determine a storm's strength using maximum sustained winds.
  - Accumulated cyclone energy – a metric used by several agencies to measure the longetivity of a tropical cyclone.
  - Hurricane Severity Index – a metric that measures the strength and destructive capability of a tropical cyclone based on wind and intensity.
  - Chicago Mercantile Exchange Hurricane Index – an index used to measure the damage of an Atlantic hurricane at landfall in the United States.
  - Dvorak technique – a technique created by late meteorologist Vernon Dvorak to describe the cyclone's intensity through satellite imagery.
- Tropical cyclone naming – once a tropical cyclone reaches winds of 34 kn (39 mph), a name would be given to that specific cyclone. Names are usually given by their respective RSMCs when the cyclone reaches tropical storm status.
  - History of tropical cyclone naming – history of tropical cyclone naming from the late 18th century onward.

=== Forecasting ===
- Tropical Cyclone Regional Specialized Meteorological Centre – a centre responsible for the distribution of information, advisories, and warnings in a specific region, approved by the World Meteorological Organization.
  - National Hurricane Center – tracks and monitors systems within the Atlantic and Eastern Pacific Oceans (east of 140°W).
  - Central Pacific Hurricane Center – tracks and monitors systems within the North Central Pacific Ocean (west of 140°W to the International Date Line (180°)).
  - Japan Meteorological Agency – tracks and monitors systems within the Northwestern Pacific Ocean (west of the International Date Line).
  - The India Meteorological Department – responsible for tracking and monitoring systems in the North Indian Ocean.
  - Météo-France (RSMC La Réunion) – responsible for tracking systems in the South-west Indian Ocean (west of 90°E)
  - Fiji Meteorological Service – responsible for tracking systems in the South Pacific Ocean.
- Tropical Cyclone Warning Centre –
  - Bureau of Meteorology – responsible for tracking systems within the Australian Region.
  - Meteorology, Climatology, and Geophysical Agency – a forecast agency responsible for systems affecting Indonesia and the surrounding islands.
  - Meteorological Service of New Zealand – a warning centre responsible for systems affecting New Zealand.
- Other forecasting agencies –
  - Brazilian Navy Hydrographic Center – part of the Brazilian Navy, responsible for monitoring systems within or near Brazil.
  - Canadian Hurricane Centre – tracks tropical cyclones entering or affecting Canada.
  - China Meteorological Administration – a weather service located in China that is responsible for systems entering China or in the South China Sea.
  - Eastern Pacific Hurricane Center – tracked systems east of 140°W prior to folding with the National Hurricane Center in 1988.
  - Hong Kong Observatory – a forecast agency located in Hong Kong.
  - Joint Typhoon Warning Center – tracks systems in the Central Pacific, Western Pacific, South Pacific, and Indian Oceans.
  - Philippine Atmospheric, Geophysical and Astronomical Services Administration – a forecasting agency that tracks systems within the Philippine Area of Responsibility.
- Tropical Cyclone Formation Alert – an advisory from the Joint Typhoon Warning Center that is given to a tropical disturbance that has a high chance of formation.
- Tropical cyclone forecast model – computer program that uses meteorological data to forecast tropical cyclones and their potential impact.
- Tropical cyclone forecasting – the science of forecasting a tropical cyclone's strength, intensity, and potential effects in land areas.
- Tropical cyclone rainfall forecasting – used to predict potential precipitation in a tropical cyclone.
- Tropical cyclone track forecasting – a forecast used to predict a tropical cyclone's location over a period of time.
- Tropical cyclone warnings and watches – alerts issued by weather agencies to coastal areas about the impact and danger related to a tropical cyclone.

== Tropical cyclone history ==
=== Tropical cyclone seasons ===
- Atlantic hurricane season (list)
- Pacific hurricane season (list)
- Pacific typhoon season (list)
- North Indian Ocean tropical cyclone season (list)
- South-West Indian Ocean tropical cyclone season (list)
- Australian region tropical cyclone season (list)
- South Pacific tropical cyclone season (list)
- South Atlantic tropical cyclone

=== Specific tropical cyclones ===
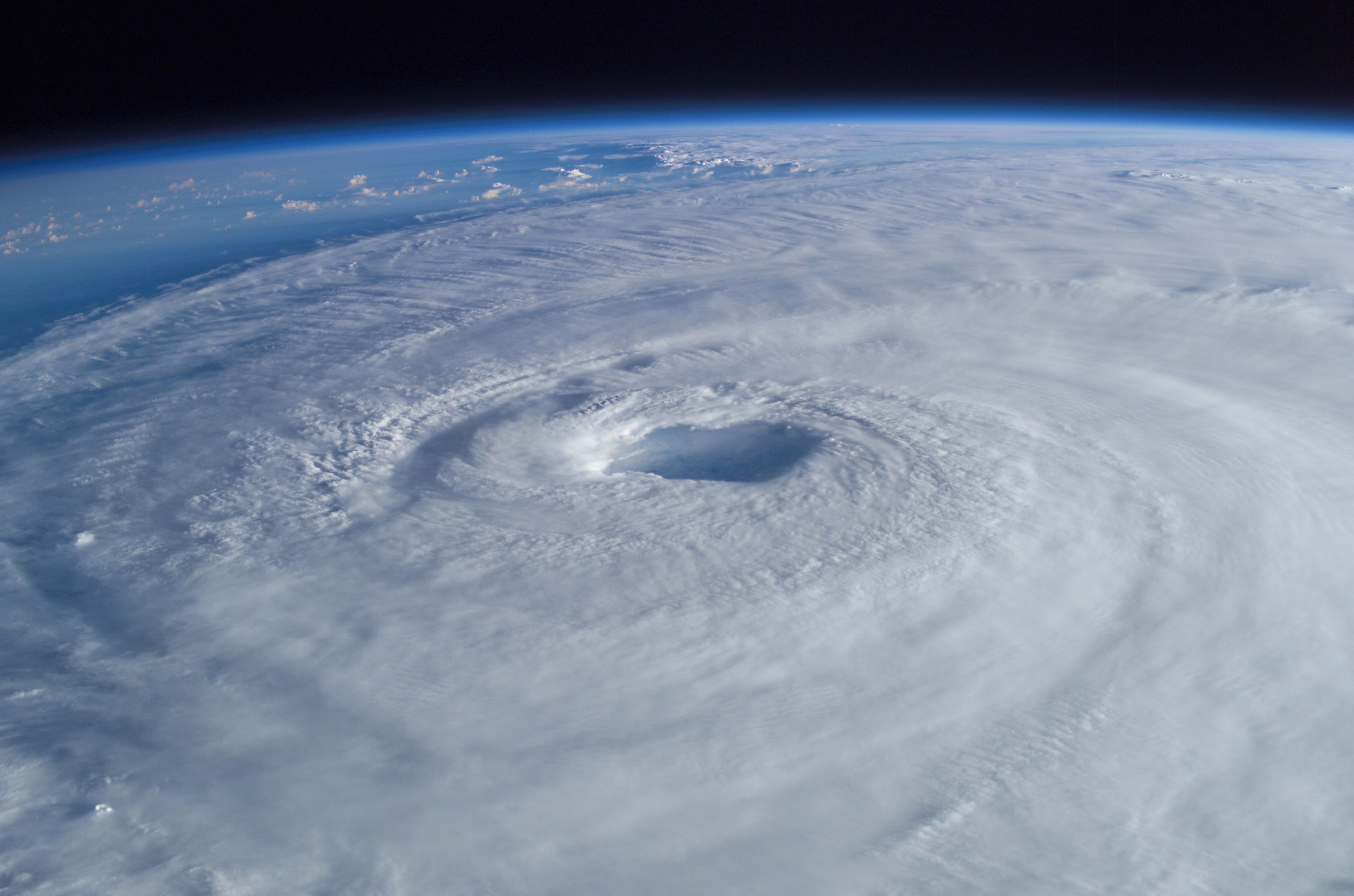
Hurricane Isabel viewed from the International Space Station in September 2003

- Lists of tropical cyclones
  - Lists of tropical cyclone names (current)
  - List of unnamed tropical cyclones
  - List of historical tropical cyclone names
  - List of tropical cyclones near the Equator
  - Lists of retired tropical cyclone names
  - List of tropical cyclone records
  - List of the deadliest tropical cyclones
  - List of the costliest tropical cyclones
  - List of the wettest tropical cyclones by country
  - List of the wettest tropical cyclones in the United States
  - List of the most intense tropical cyclones
- Lists of Atlantic hurricanes
  - List of Category 1 Atlantic hurricanes
  - List of Category 2 Atlantic hurricanes
  - List of Category 3 Atlantic hurricanes
  - List of Category 4 Atlantic hurricanes
  - List of Category 5 Atlantic hurricanes
  - List of costliest Atlantic hurricanes
  - List of deadliest Atlantic hurricanes
  - List of Atlantic hurricane records
  - List of retired Atlantic hurricane names
  - List of off-season Atlantic hurricanes
- List of Atlantic–Pacific crossover hurricanes
- List of Pacific hurricanes
  - List of retired Pacific hurricane names
  - List of off-season Pacific hurricanes
  - List of Eastern Pacific tropical storms
  - List of Category 1 Pacific hurricanes
  - List of Category 2 Pacific hurricanes
  - List of Category 3 Pacific hurricanes
  - List of Category 4 Pacific hurricanes
  - List of Category 5 Pacific hurricanes
- List of Pacific typhoons
  - List of retired Pacific typhoon names
  - List of retired Philippine typhoon names
  - List of Western Pacific tropical depressions
  - List of Western Pacific tropical storms
  - List of Western Pacific severe tropical storms
  - List of strong typhoons
  - List of very strong typhoons
  - List of violent typhoons
  - List of super typhoons
- List of North Indian Ocean cyclonic storms
  - List of depressions and deep depressions in the North Indian Ocean
  - List of cyclonic storms
  - List of severe cyclonic storms
  - List of very severe cyclonic storms
  - List of extremely severe cyclonic storms
  - List of super cyclonic storms
- List of Australian region tropical cyclones
  - List of Category 1 Australian region tropical cyclones
  - List of Category 2 Australian region tropical cyclones
  - List of Category 3 Australian region severe tropical cyclones
  - List of Category 4 Australian region severe tropical cyclones
  - List of Category 5 Australian region severe tropical cyclones
  - List of off-season Australian region tropical cyclones
  - List of retired Australian region cyclone names
- List of South Pacific tropical cyclones
  - List of South Pacific tropical disturbances and tropical depressions
  - List of Category 1 South Pacific tropical cyclones
  - List of Category 2 South Pacific tropical cyclones
  - List of Category 3 South Pacific tropical cyclones
  - List of Category 4 South Pacific tropical cyclones
  - List of Category 5 South Pacific tropical cyclones
  - List of off-season South Pacific tropical cyclones
  - List of retired South Pacific cyclone names
- List of South-West Indian Ocean tropical cyclones
  - List of South-West Indian Ocean moderate tropical storms
  - List of South-West Indian Ocean severe tropical storms
  - List of South-West Indian Ocean tropical cyclones
  - List of South-West Indian Ocean intense tropical cyclones
  - List of South-West Indian Ocean very intense tropical cyclones
  - List of off-season South-West Indian Ocean tropical cyclones

== See also ==
- Index of meteorology articles
- Outline of meteorology
- Tropical cyclones by year
