= List of typhoons =

List of typhoons can refer to:

- List of Pacific typhoons
- List of Pacific typhoon seasons
