= List of Western Pacific tropical storms =

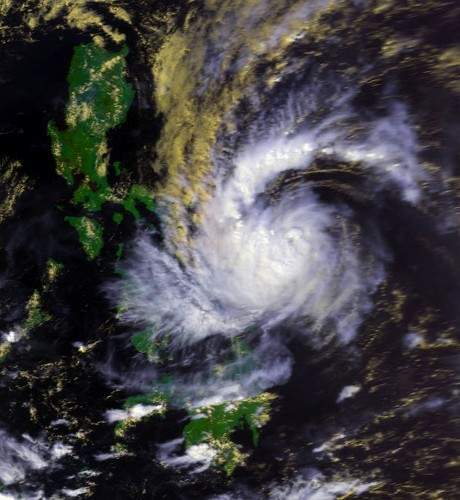
Tropical Storm Thelma, a deadly tropical storm that impacted the Philippines in November 1991

A tropical storm is a tropical cyclone that reaches maximum sustained winds between 34–63 knots (39–72 mph; 63–117 km/h). The Japan Meteorological Agency (JMA) is the main weather forecasting agency in the Northwest Pacific basin, where it measures sustained winds by averaging wind speeds in a period of ten minutes. The basin is limited to the north of the equator between the 100th meridian east and the 180th meridian. This list does not include storms that are on severe tropical storm or typhoon intensity.

== Background ==
RSMC Tokyo's Tropical Cyclone Intensity Scale
Category	Sustained winds
Violent typhoon	≥105 knots ≥194 km/h
Very strong typhoon	85–104 knots 157–193 km/h
Typhoon	64–84 knots 118–156 km/h
Severe tropical storm	48–63 knots 89–117 km/h
Tropical storm	34–47 knots 62–88 km/h
Tropical depression	≤33 knots ≤61 km/h

The Northwest Pacific basin covers a vast area in the Pacific Ocean, located north of the equator, between 100°E and 180°E. Several weather agencies monitor this basin, however it is officially monitored by the Japan Meteorological Agency (JMA, RSMC Tokyo), who is responsible for forecasting, naming and issuing warnings for tropical cyclones. Unofficially, the Joint Typhoon Warning Center also monitors the basin, however these warnings measures 1-minute sustained wind speeds, comparing their scale to the Saffir–Simpson scale. The JMA uses a simpler scale on classifying tropical cyclones adapted by the ESCAP/WMO Typhoon Committee measuring 10-minute sustained wind speeds, ranging from a tropical depression, tropical storm, severe tropical storm and typhoon. Furthermore, the JMA divides the typhoon category into three sub-categories for domestic purposes – a strong typhoon, very strong typhoon and violent typhoon.

This article covers a list of systems developing in the Northwest Pacific basin that were classified by the JMA's category of a tropical storm. The category of a tropical storm ranges with 10-minute sustained winds of between 34 and 63 knots (63–117 km/h; 39–72 mph).

== Systems ==
Key

- † Discontinuous duration (weakened below 'Tropical storm' status then restrengthened to that classification at least once)
- ‡ Intensified past tropical storm intensity after exiting basin
- Italicised rows indicate information that is operational. The storm's duration, wind speeds, or pressure could change after its post-analysis.

=== 1977–1979 ===
Name	System dates	Duration (hours)	Sustained wind speeds	Pressure	Areas affected	Damage (USD)	Deaths	Refs
Wanda	August 1 – 6, 1977	144	75 km/h (45 mph)	985 hPa (29.09 inHg)	None	None	None	
Eight	August 22, 1977	18	75 km/h (45 mph)	988 hPa (29.17 inHg)	None	None	None	
Carla	September 3 – 4, 1977	36	65 km/h (40 mph)	990 hPa (29.23 inHg)	Vietnam, Laos	Unknown	Unknown	
Fifteen	October 13, 1977	18	75 km/h (45 mph)	990 hPa (29.23 inHg)	Japan	None	None	
Polly	June 18 – 20, 1978	54	85 km/h (50 mph)	985 hPa (29.09 inHg)	Ryukyu Islands, Japan	None	None	
Rose	June 23 – 24, 1978	42	85 km/h (50 mph)	990 hPa (29.23 inHg)	Philippines, Taiwan	None	None	
Shirley	June 30, 1978	12	85 km/h (50 mph)	992 hPa (29.29 inHg)	Vietnam	None	None	
Bonnie	August 10 – 12, 1978	42	75 km/h (45 mph)	985 hPa (29.09 inHg)	South China, Vietnam	Unknown	Unknown	
Della	August 12 – 13, 1978	30	85 km/h (50 mph)	985 hPa (29.09 inHg)	Philippines, Taiwan, China	None	None	
13W	August 19 – 20, 1978	36	75 km/h (45 mph)	998 hPa (29.47 inHg)	Japan	None	None	
Gloria	August 29 – 31, 1978	36	75 km/h (45 mph)	992 hPa (29.29 inHg)	Ryukyu Islands	None	None	
Hester	August 30 – September 1, 1978	60	75 km/h (45 mph)	990 hPa (29.23 inHg)	Japan	None	None	
Twenty-seven	November 2 – 3, 1978	36	65 km/h (40 mph)	994 hPa (29.35 inHg)	Philippines, Vietnam	None	None	
Dot	May 13 – 14, 1979	30	75 km/h (45 mph)	985 hPa (29.09 inHg)	Philippines	Unknown	Unknown	
05W	May 23 – 24, 1979	24	75 km/h (45 mph)	992 hPa (29.29 inHg)	Taiwan	None	None	
Ken	September 2 – 4, 1979	60	85 km/h (50 mph)	990 hPa (29.23 inHg)	Japan	Unknown	None	
Nancy	September 19 – 21, 1979	60	85 km/h (50 mph)	992 hPa (29.29 inHg)	South China, Vietnam	Unknown	Unknown	
Pamela	September 25 – 26, 1979	18	75 km/h (45 mph)	994 hPa (29.35 inHg)	None	None	None	
Roger	October 4 – 7, 1979	78	85 km/h (50 mph)	985 hPa (29.09 inHg)	Japan	None	None	
Ben	December 21 – 23, 1979	54	85 km/h (50 mph)	994 hPa (29.35 inHg)	Philippines	Unknown	Unknown	

=== 1980s ===
Name	System dates	Duration (hours)	Sustained wind speeds	Pressure	Areas affected	Damage (USD)	Deaths	Refs
Alex	October 13, 1980	18	65 km/h (40 mph)	998 hPa (29.47 inHg)	None	None	None	
Cary	October 30 – November 1, 1980	72	85 km/h (50 mph)	996 hPa (29.41 inHg)	Philippines, Vietnam	None	None	
Ed	December 15 – 20, 1980	132	85 km/h (50 mph)	990 hPa (29.23 inHg)	Philippines	None	None	
Holly	April 30 – May 6, 1981	138	85 km/h (50 mph)	996 hPa (29.41 inHg)	Marshall Islands	None	None	
Nina	July 22 – 23, 1981	18	75 km/h (45 mph)	992 hPa (29.29 inHg)	Taiwan, East China	None	None	
11W	August 1 – 2, 1981	30	75 km/h (45 mph)	990 hPa (29.23 inHg)	Mariana Islands	None	None	
Roy	August 5 – 7, 1981	60	85 km/h (50 mph)	985 hPa (29.09 inHg)	None	None	None	
Warren	August 18 – 19, 1981	12	65 km/h (40 mph)	994 hPa (29.35 inHg)	None	None	None	
Fabian	October 13 – 14, 1981	24	85 km/h (50 mph)	994 hPa (29.23 inHg)	Philippines, Vietnam	None	None	
Jeff	December 23 – 24, 1981	30	75 km/h (45 mph)	1000 hPa (29.53 inHg)	Caroline Islands	None	None	
Tess-Val	June 28 – July 3, 1982	156†	85 km/h (50 mph)	985 hPa (29.09 inHg)	Taiwan, China, Ryukyu Islands	None	None	
Skip	June 29 – July 1, 1982	54	85 km/h (50 mph)	992 hPa (29.29 inHg)	None	None	None	
Lola	September 17 – 19, 1982	60	85 km/h (50 mph)	990 hPa (29.23 inHg)	None	None	None	
Sarah	June 25, 1983	18	65 km/h (40 mph)	998 hPa (29.47 inHg)	Indochina	Unknown	Unknown	
Carmen	August 13 – 15, 1983	48	75 km/h (45 mph)	992 hPa (29.29 inHg)	Philippines	None	None	
Dom	June 29 – July 1, 1983	90†	75 km/h (45 mph)	996 hPa (29.41 inHg)	None	None	None	
Herbert	October 7 – 8, 1983	48	85 km/h (50 mph)	994 hPa (29.35 inHg)	Philippines, Vietnam, Cambodia	None	None	
Kim	October 16 – 17, 1983	18	75 km/h (45 mph)	994 hPa (29.35 inHg)	Philippines, Vietnam, Cambodia, Thailand	$26 million	>200	
Norris	November 9 – 11, 1983	48	85 km/h (50 mph)	994 hPa (29.35 inHg)	None	None	None	
Sperry	December 3 – 4, 1983	48	85 km/h (50 mph)	996 hPa (29.41 inHg)	None	None	None	
Vernon	June 9 – 10, 1984	42	75 km/h (45 mph)	994 hPa (29.35 inHg)	Vietnam	None	None	
Lynn	September 25, 1984	18	85 km/h (50 mph)	998 hPa (29.47 inHg)	Vietnam	None	None	
Nina	September 27 – October 2, 1984	120	85 km/h (50 mph)	992 hPa (29.29 inHg)	None	None	None	
Roy	October 11 – 12, 1984	42	75 km/h (45 mph)	996 hPa (29.41 inHg)	Mariana Islands	None	None	
Susan	October 12, 1984	12	75 km/h (45 mph)	996 hPa (29.41 inHg)	Vietnam	Unknown	33	
Elsie	January 7 – 8, 1985	42	65 km/h (40 mph)	1000 hPa (29.53 inHg)	Caroline Islands	None	None	
04W	June 17 – 19, 1985	60	65 km/h (40 mph)	990 hPa (29.23 inHg)	South China, Vietnam	None	None	
Val	September 15 – 17, 1985	60	85 km/h (50 mph)	996 hPa (29.41 inHg)	Taiwan	None	None	
Winona	September 20 – 22, 1985	42	85 km/h (50 mph)	990 hPa (29.23 inHg)	South China	None	None	
Gordon	November 21 – 25, 1985	108	75 km/h (45 mph)	998 hPa (29.47 inHg)	Malaysia, Vietnam	None	None	
Mac	May 23 – 28, 1986	120	75 km/h (45 mph)	992 hPa (29.29 inHg)	Vietnam, China, Taiwan, Ryukyu Islands	Unknown	Unknown	
Owen	June 29 – July 2, 1986	78	85 km/h (50 mph)	985 hPa (29.09 inHg)	Ryukyu Islands	None	None	
Nine	July 20 – 21, 1986	30	65 km/h (40 mph)	996 hPa (29.41 inHg)	South China	None	None	
Fifteen	September 2, 1986	28	65 km/h (40 mph)	992 hPa (29.29 inHg)	Japan	None	None	
Dom	October 9 – 11, 1986	66	75 km/h (45 mph)	996 hPa (29.41 inHg)	Philippines, Vietnam	$4 million	16	
Georgia	October 18 – 22, 1986	102	85 km/h (50 mph)	985 hPa (29.09 inHg)	Philippines, Vietnam, Laos	None	None	
Percy	April 11, 1987	18	85 km/h (50 mph)	1000 hPa (29.53 inHg)	Caroline Islands	None	None	
Ruth	June 18 – 19, 1987	24	65 km/h (40 mph)	992 hPa (29.29 inHg)	South China	None	None	
Ten	August 10 – 11, 1987	12	65 km/h (40 mph)	1006 hPa (29.41 inHg)	Japan	None	None	
June	September 29 – October 1, 1987	66	85 km/h (50 mph)	992 hPa (29.29 inHg)	Caroline Islands	None	None	
Maury	November 16 – 18, 1987	54	85 km/h (50 mph)	994 hPa (29.35 inHg)	Philippines, Vietnam	None	None	
03W	June 5, 1988	18	65 km/h (40 mph)	1000 hPa (29.53 inHg)	Philippines, Taiwan	None	None	
Eight	August 2, 1988	24	65 km/h (40 mph)	998 hPa (29.47 inHg)	Japan	None	None	
Bill	August 6 – 8, 1988	66	85 km/h (50 mph)	985 hPa (29.09 inHg)	Ryukyu Islands, East China	Unknown	110	
Clara	August 10 – 14, 1988	96	75 km/h (45 mph)	994 hPa (29.35 inHg)	None	None	None	
Eleven	August 14 – 15, 1988	18	65 km/h (40 mph)	1000 hPa (29.53 inHg)	Japan	None	None	
Thirteen	August 15 – 16, 1988	18	65 km/h (40 mph)	1000 hPa (29.53 inHg)	Japan	None	None	
Elsie	August 29 – September 1, 1988	84	85 km/h (50 mph)	992 hPa (29.29 inHg)	None	None	None	
Gay	September 3 – 4, 1988	42	75 km/h (45 mph)	996 hPa (29.41 inHg)	None	None	None	
Jeff	September 13 – 15, 1988	54	85 km/h (50 mph)	994 hPa (29.35 inHg)	None	None	None	
Mamie	September 21 – 23, 1988	48	85 km/h (50 mph)	990 hPa (29.23 inHg)	South China, Vietnam	None	None	
Twenty-five	October 8 – 10, 1988	48	85 km/h (50 mph)	992 hPa (29.29 inHg)	Vietnam	None	None	
Val	December 24 – 25, 1988	30	85 km/h (50 mph)	992 hPa (29.29 inHg)	Philippines	None	None	
Winona	January 18 – 19, 1989	42	65 km/h (40 mph)	1000 hPa (29.53 inHg)	Wake Island, Mariana Islands	None	None	
Hope	July 16 – 21, 1989	114	85 km/h (50 mph)	990 hPa (29.23 inHg)	East China, Ryukyu Islands	$340 million	198	
Peggy	August 16 – 18, 1989	42	65 km/h (40 mph)	996 hPa (29.41 inHg)	Mariana Islands	None	None	
21W	August 26 – 27, 1989	24	65 km/h (40 mph)	1002 hPa (29.59 inHg)	None	None	None	

=== 1990s ===
Name	System dates	Duration (hours)	Sustained wind speeds	Pressure	Areas affected	Damage (USD)	Deaths	Refs
Lewis	April 29 – May 3, 1990	96	65 km/h (40 mph)	998 hPa (29.47 inHg)	Caroline Islands	None	None	
Robyn	July 8 – 11, 1990	96	85 km/h (50 mph)	992 hPa (29.29 inHg)	Ryukyu Islands, South Korea	None	None	
Aka	August 13 – 14, 1990	30	75 km/h (45 mph)	994 hPa (29.35 inHg)	Marshall Islands	None	None	
Ira	October 2 – 3, 1990	24	65 km/h (40 mph)	996 hPa (29.41 inHg)	Indochina	None	24	
Lola	October 17 – 18, 1990	30	65 km/h (40 mph)	998 hPa (29.47 inHg)	Indochina	None	16	
Vanessa	April 26 – 27, 1991	48	85 km/h (50 mph)	994 hPa (29.35 inHg)	Philippines	None	None	
15W	August 28 – 29, 1991	30	65 km/h (40 mph)	992 hPa (29.29 inHg)	Japan, South Korea	None	None	
Harry	August 30 – 31, 1991	36	75 km/h (45 mph)	992 hPa (29.29 inHg)	Japan, South Korea	None	None	
Joel	September 5 – 7, 1991	51	85 km/h (50 mph)	985 hPa (29.09 inHg)	Philippines, China, Taiwan	None	None	
Thelma	November 4 – 7, 1991	78	75 km/h (45 mph)	992 hPa (29.29 inHg)	Philippines, Vietnam	$27.7 million	5,081	
Wilda	November 15 – 19, 1991	108	85 km/h (50 mph)	992 hPa (29.29 inHg)	Philippines	Unknown	Unknown	
Ekeka	February 3 – 4, 1992	24	85 km/h (50 mph)	990 hPa (29.23 inHg)	Marshall Islands	None	None	
Faye	July 17 – 18, 1992	24	65 km/h (40 mph)	1000 hPa (29.53 inHg)	South China	None	2	
Helen	July 26 – 27, 1992	36	75 km/h (45 mph)	996 hPa (29.41 inHg)	None	None	None	
Mark	August 16 – 19, 1992	78	85 km/h (50 mph)	990 hPa (29.23 inHg)	East China, Taiwan	$10.4 million	1	
Lois	August 19 – 20, 1992	42	65 km/h (40 mph)	996 hPa (29.41 inHg)	None	None	None	
Nina	August 19 – 21, 1992	54	65 km/h (40 mph)	996 hPa (29.41 inHg)	None	None	None	
Val	September 25 – 27, 1992	60	85 km/h (50 mph)	990 hPa (29.23 inHg)	None	None	None	
Zack	October 13 – 15, 1992	36	75 km/h (45 mph)	992 hPa (29.29 inHg)	Marshall Islands	None	None	
Forrest	November 13 – 15, 1992	72	85 km/h (50 mph)‡	996 hPa (29.41 inHg)	Vietnam, Thailand, Myanmar	None	2	
Ofelia	July 25 – 27, 1993	48	85 km/h (50 mph)	990 hPa (29.23 inHg)	Japan	$197 million	13	
Winona	August 23 – 29, 1993	144	75 km/h (45 mph)	990 hPa (29.23 inHg)	Philippines, Vietnam	Unknown	Unknown	
Gene	October 8 – 9, 1993	94	65 km/h (40 mph)	998 hPa (29.47 inHg)	Caroline Islands	None	None	
Jeana	November 9 – 12, 1993	78	85 km/h (50 mph)	992 hPa (29.29 inHg)	Caroline Islands	None	None	
Sharon	June 23 – 25, 1994	36	75 km/h (45 mph)	996 hPa (29.41 inHg)	Philippines, South China	$5.27 billion	13	
Vanessa	July 9 – 11, 1994	54	75 km/h (45 mph)	990 hPa (29.23 inHg)	Philippines	None	None	
Yunya	July 18 – 19, 1994	36	85 km/h (50 mph)	990 hPa (29.23 inHg)	Philippines	$37.6 million	11	
Amy	July 29 – 30, 1994	42	85 km/h (50 mph)	985 hPa (29.09 inHg)	South China, Vietnam	$8 million	15	
Brendan	July 29 – August 2, 1994	108	85 km/h (50 mph)	990 hPa (29.23 inHg)	Ryukyu Islands, Korean Peninsula	None	2	
Caitlin	August 2 – 4, 1994	48	85 km/h (50 mph)	990 hPa (29.23 inHg)	Philippines, Taiwan, China	$643 million	18	
Li	August 13 – 14, 1994	36	85 km/h (50 mph)	992 hPa (29.29 inHg)	None	None	None	
Harry	August 26 – 28, 1994	78	85 km/h (50 mph)	990 hPa (29.23 inHg)	Philippines, South China, Vietnam	$56.5 million	Unknown	
Joel	September 5 – 7, 1994	48	85 km/h (50 mph)	990 hPa (29.23 inHg)	South China, Vietnam	None	None	
Luke	September 8 – 13, 1994	96	85 km/h (50 mph)	990 hPa (29.23 inHg)	Philippines, South China, Vietnam	$11.7 million	None	
Nat	September 17 – 21, 1994	90	75 km/h (45 mph)	992 hPa (29.29 inHg)	Mariana Islands	None	None	
Ruth	September 25 – 26, 1994	30	75 km/h (45 mph)	996 hPa (29.41 inHg)	None	None	None	
Yuri	October 23 – 25, 1994	42	75 km/h (45 mph)	996 hPa (29.41 inHg)	Wake Island	None	None	
Chuck	April 29 – 30, 1995	48	65 km/h (40 mph)	998 hPa (29.47 inHg)	Marshall Islands	None	None	
Deanna	June 3 – 8, 1995	126	75 km/h (45 mph)	996 hPa (29.41 inHg)	Philippines, Taiwan, Ryukyu Islands	None	None	
Irving	August 17 – 19, 1995	54	85 km/h (50 mph)	990 hPa (29.23 inHg)	South China	None	None	
Janis	August 21 – 25, 1995	102	75 km/h (45 mph)	996 hPa (29.41 inHg)	Philippines, Taiwan, Ryukyu Islands, Korean Peninsula	$429 million	45	
Nina	September 4 – 7, 1995	78	75 km/h (45 mph)	992 hPa (29.29 inHg)	Philippines, South China	None	None	
Val	October 11 – 13, 1995	60	75 km/h (45 mph)	996 hPa (29.41 inHg)	Mariana Islands	None	None	
Brian	November 2 – 3, 1995	42	75 km/h (45 mph)	998 hPa (29.47 inHg)	Mariana Islands	None	None	
01W	February 29, 1996	24	65 km/h (40 mph)	998 hPa (29.47 inHg)	Philippines	None	None	
Ann	April 5 – 7, 1996	54	65 km/h (40 mph)	1000 hPa (29.53 inHg)	Philippines	None	None	
Cam	May 20 – 23, 1996	78	75 km/h (45 mph)	994 hPa (29.35 inHg)	Philippines, Taiwan	None	None	
Piper	August 23 – 26, 1996	66	75 km/h (45 mph)	996 hPa (29.41 inHg)	None	None	None	
Ernie	November 9 – 14, 1996	120	75 km/h (45 mph)	996 hPa (29.41 inHg)	Philippines	$5.1 million	24	
Jimmy	April 23 – 25, 1997	54	65 km/h (40 mph)	994 hPa (29.35 inHg)	Caroline Islands	None	None	
Kelly	May 8 – 10, 1997	54	65 km/h (40 mph)	998 hPa (29.47 inHg)	Mariana Islands	None	None	
Levi	May 28 – 29, 1997	36	75 km/h (45 mph)	992 hPa (29.29 inHg)	Philippines, Ryukyu Islands	Unknown	53	
Scott	July 28 – August 2, 1997	126	75 km/h (45 mph)	992 hPa (29.29 inHg)	None	None	None	
Cass	August 29 – 30, 1997	30	85 km/h (50 mph)	992 hPa (29.29 inHg)	China	None	None	
Mort	November 11 – 15, 1997	114	85 km/h (50 mph)	992 hPa (29.29 inHg)	Philippines	None	None	
Nichole	July 9 – 10, 1998	30	65 km/h (40 mph)	998 hPa (29.47 inHg)	Taiwan, East China	None	None	
Waldo	September 20 – 21, 1998	30	85 km/h (50 mph)	994 hPa (29.35 inHg)	Japan	None	None	
Chip	November 12 – 13, 1998	42	75 km/h (45 mph)	994 hPa (29.35 inHg)	Vietnam	$923,000	17	
Dawn	November 19, 1998	18	65 km/h (40 mph)	998 hPa (29.47 inHg)	Vietnam, Cambodia	$28 million	187	
Elvis	November 24 – 26, 1998	42	75 km/h (45 mph)	992 hPa (29.29 inHg)	Philippines, Vietnam	$30 million	49	
Gil	December 9 – 11, 1998	36	75 km/h (45 mph)	992 hPa (29.29 inHg)	Vietnam, Thailand	None	None	
07W	July 16 – 17, 1999	30	65 km/h (40 mph)	996 hPa (29.41 inHg)	None	None	None	
10W	July 26 – 27, 1999	18	75 km/h (45 mph)	985 hPa (29.09 inHg)	China	None	None	
Paul	August 4 – 7, 1999	66	85 km/h (50 mph)	980 hPa (28.94 inHg)	Japan, East China, South Korea	None	None	
Rachel	August 7 – 8, 1999	18	65 km/h (40 mph)	992 hPa (29.29 inHg)	Taiwan, South China	None	None	
Wendy	September 3, 1999	12	65 km/h (40 mph)	990 hPa (29.23 inHg)	Philippines, South China	$309 million	133	
Zia	September 14 – 15, 1999	24	65 km/h (40 mph)	990 hPa (29.23 inHg)	East China	None	None	
Cam	September 24 – 26, 1999	42	85 km/h (50 mph)	992 hPa (29.29 inHg)	South China	None	1	
Eve	October 17 – 20, 1999	66	85 km/h (50 mph)	990 hPa (29.23 inHg)	Philippines, Vietnam	$235 million	590	

=== 2000s ===
Name	System dates	Duration (hours)	Sustained wind speeds	Pressure	Areas affected	Damage (USD)	Deaths	Refs
Longwang	May 19 – 20, 2000	30	85 km/h (50 mph)	990 hPa (29.23 inHg)	Ryukyu Islands	None	None	
Tembin	July 19 – 21, 2000	66	75 km/h (45 mph)	992 hPa (29.29 inHg)	None	None	None	
Omais	July 28 – 29, 2000	24	65 km/h (40 mph)	996 hPa (29.41 inHg)	None	None	None	
Kaemi	August 21 – 22, 2000	24	75 km/h (45 mph)	985 hPa (29.09 inHg)	Vietnam, Cambodia	None	14	
Maria	August 28 – September 1, 2000	90	75 km/h (45 mph)	985 hPa (29.09 inHg)	East China	None	None	
Bopha	September 6 – 10, 2000	102	75 km/h (45 mph)	998 hPa (29.47 inHg)	Taiwan, Ryukyu Islands, Philippines	None	None	
Rumbia	November 28 – 30, 2000	54	75 km/h (45 mph)	998 hPa (29.47 inHg)	Philippines, Vietnam	$1 million	48	
Trami	July 10 – 11, 2001	36	75 km/h (45 mph)	994 hPa (29.35 inHg)	Taiwan	None	3	
Usagi	August 18, 2001	18	65 km/h (40 mph)	992 hPa (29.29 inHg)	South China, Vietnam	$3.2 million	3	
Sepat	August 27 – 30, 2001	72	85 km/h (50 mph)	990 hPa (29.23 inHg)	None	None	None	
Fitow	August 30 – 31, 2001	12	65 km/h (40 mph)	990 hPa (29.23 inHg)	South China	$202 million	4	
Kajiki	December 5 – 8, 2001	66†	65 km/h (40 mph)	996 hPa (29.41 inHg)	Philippines, Vietnam	Unknown	None	
Vamei	March 24 – 25, 2001	36	85 km/h (50 mph)	1006 hPa (29.71 inHg)	Singapore, Malaysia, Sumatra	$3.6 million	5	
Tapah	January 12, 2002	24	75 km/h (45 mph)	996 hPa (29.41 inHg)	Philippines	Unknown	None	
Kalmaegi	July 20 – 21, 2001	18	65 km/h (40 mph)	1002 hPa (29.59 inHg)	None	None	None	
Vongfong	August 18 – 19, 2002	48	75 km/h (45 mph)	985 hPa (29.09 inHg)	South China	$86 million	9	
Hagupit	September 11, 2002	24	85 km/h (50 mph)	990 hPa (29.23 inHg)	South China	$32.5 million	25	
Changmi	September 21 – 22, 2002	18	85 km/h (50 mph)	985 hPa (29.09 inHg)	None	None	None	
Mekkhala	September 25 – 27, 2002	72	85 km/h (50 mph)	990 hPa (29.23 inHg)	South China	$103 million	None	
Yanyan	January 18 – 20, 2003	54	65 km/h (40 mph)	1000 hPa (29.53 inHg)	None	None	None	
Morakot	August 2 – 4, 2003	54	85 km/h (50 mph)	992 hPa (29.29 inHg)	Taiwan, East China	$31 million	3	
Vamco	August 19, 2003	18	65 km/h (40 mph)	996 hPa (29.41 inHg)	Taiwan	$4.7 million	None	
Kompasu	July 14 – 16, 2004	60	85 km/h (50 mph)	992 hPa (29.29 inHg)	Philippines, Taiwan, South China	Unknown	None	
Malou	August 4, 2004	21	75 km/h (45 mph)	996 hPa (29.41 inHg)	Japan	$10,000	None	
Malakas	August 11 – 13, 2004	66	85 km/h (50 mph)	990 hPa (29.23 inHg)	None	None	None	
Haima	September 11 – 13, 2004	54	75 km/h (45 mph)	996 hPa (29.41 inHg)	Taiwan, East China	$7.64 million	None	
Merbok	November 22, 2004	6	65 km/h (40 mph)	1000 hPa (29.53 inHg)	Philippines	$5.1 million	31	
Talas	December 10 – 15, 2004	126	75 km/h (45 mph)	994 hPa (29.35 inHg)	Caroline Islands, Mariana Islands	$750,000	None	
Noru	December 18 – 21, 2004	78	85 km/h (50 mph)	990 hPa (29.23 inHg)	Mariana Islands	None	None	
Nalgae	July 20 – 24, 2005	156	85 km/h (50 mph)	990 hPa (29.23 inHg)	None	None	None	
Washi	July 29 – 31, 2005	54	85 km/h (50 mph)	985 hPa (29.09 inHg)	South China, Vietnam	None	None	
Vicente	September 16 – 18, 2005	54	85 km/h (50 mph)	985 hPa (29.09 inHg)	Philippines, South China	$3.48 million	22	
Tembin	November 10, 2005	12	65 km/h (40 mph)	1002 hPa (29.59 inHg)	Caroline Islands, Philippines	None	None	
Jelawat	June 27 – 28, 2006	48	75 km/h (45 mph)	996 hPa (29.41 inHg)	Philippines, South China	Unknown	7	
Sonamu	August 14 – 15, 2006	30	65 km/h (40 mph)	992 hPa (29.29 inHg)	None	None	None	
Rumbia	October 3 – 5, 2006	60	85 km/h (50 mph)	980 hPa (28.94 inHg)	None	None	None	
Trami	December 17 – 18, 2006	30	65 km/h (40 mph)	1000 hPa (29.53 inHg)	Caroline Islands	None	None	
Toraji	July 4 – 5, 2007	36	65 km/h (40 mph)	994 hPa (29.35 inHg)	South China, Vietnam	$9.7 million	None	
Wutip	August 8, 2007	24	65 km/h (40 mph)	990 hPa (29.23 inHg)	Philippines, Taiwan	None	3	
Francisco	September 23 – 25, 2007	42	75 km/h (45 mph)	990 hPa (29.23 inHg)	South China, Indochina	Unknown	Unknown	
Haiyan	October 5 – 6, 2007	30	75 km/h (45 mph)	994 hPa (29.35 inHg)	None	None	None	
Lingling	October 11 – 15, 2007	84	85 km/h (50 mph)	994 hPa (29.35 inHg)	None	None	None	
Tapah	November 12, 2007	18	65 km/h (40 mph)	996 hPa (29.41 inHg)	None	None	None	
Mekkhala	September 29 – 30, 2008	36	85 km/h (50 mph)	990 hPa (29.23 inHg)	Vietnam, Laos, Thailand	$6.6 million	16	
Higos	October 2 – 3, 2008	30	65 km/h (40 mph)	998 hPa (29.47 inHg)	Philippines, Taiwan, South China	$6.5 million	Unknown	
Bavi	October 19 – 20, 2008	30	85 km/h (50 mph)	992 hPa (29.29 inHg)	None	None	None	
Haishen	November 15 – 17, 2008	42	75 km/h (45 mph)	1004 hPa (29.65 inHg)	None	None	None	
Noul	November 16 – 17, 2008	24	75 km/h (45 mph)	994 hPa (29.35 inHg)	Philippines, Vietnam, Cambodia	$8.4 million	21	
Nangka	June 23 – 26, 2009	84	75 km/h (45 mph)	994 hPa (29.35 inHg)	Philippines	$54,000	6	
Soudelor	July 11, 2009	24	65 km/h (40 mph)	992 hPa (29.29 inHg)	Philippines, South China	$9 million	17	
Goni	August 3 – 8, 2009	90†	75 km/h (45 mph)	999 hPa (29.23 inHg)	Philippines, South China, Vietnam	Unknown	8	
Etau	August 9 – 12, 2009	90	75 km/h (45 mph)	992 hPa (29.29 inHg)	Japan	$87.5 million	28	
Mujigae	September 10 – 11, 2009	48	75 km/h (45 mph)	990 hPa (29.23 inHg)	Philippines, South China, Vietnam	$14.6 million	11	
Nepartak	October 9 – 13, 2009	114	85 km/h (50 mph)	992 hPa (29.29 inHg)	Mariana Islands	None	None	

=== 2010s ===
Name	System dates	Duration (hours)	Sustained wind speeds	Pressure	Areas affected	Damage (USD)	Deaths	Refs
Omais	March 24 – 25, 2010	36	65 km/h (40 mph)	998 hPa (29.47 inHg)	Caroline Islands	$10,000	None	
Mindulle	August 23 – 24, 2010	48	85 km/h (50 mph)	985 hPa (29.09 inHg)	Vietnam	$43.3 million	10	
Namtheun	August 30 – 31, 2010	18	65 km/h (40 mph)	996 hPa (29.41 inHg)	Taiwan, East China	None	None	
Aere	May 7 – 11, 2011	102	75 km/h (45 mph)	992 hPa (29.29 inHg)	Philippines, Japan	$34.4 million	48	
Sarika	June 9 – 11, 2011	42	75 km/h (45 mph)	996 hPa (29.41 inHg)	Philippines, South China	$248 million	28	
Haima	June 21 – 24, 2011	78	75 km/h (45 mph)	985 hPa (29.09 inHg)	Philippines, Indochina	$167 million	18	
Tokage	July 15, 2011	18	65 km/h (40 mph)	1000 hPa (29.53 inHg)	None	None	None	
Noru	September 3 – 6, 2011	72	75 km/h (45 mph)	990 hPa (29.23 inHg)	None	None	None	
Kulap	September 7 – 8, 2011	48	65 km/h (40 mph)	1000 hPa (29.53 inHg)	Ryukyu Islands	None	None	
Haitang	September 25 – 26, 2011	72	65 km/h (40 mph)	998 hPa (29.47 inHg)	South China, Vietnam, Laos	$20 million	25	
Banyan	October 10 – 11, 2011	12	65 km/h (40 mph)	1002 hPa (29.59 inHg)	Philippines	$2.1 million	10	
Pakhar	March 29 – April 1, 2012	84	75 km/h (45 mph)	998 hPa (29.47 inHg)	Vietnam, Cambodia	$48.1 million	9	
Doksuri	June 26 – 29, 2013	78	75 km/h (45 mph)	992 hPa (29.29 inHg)	Taiwan, South China	$418,000	None	
Wukong	December 25 – 28, 2012	78	75 km/h (45 mph)	998 hPa (29.47 inHg)	Philippines, Vietnam	$5.48 million	20	
Shanshan	February 21 – 22, 2013	18	65 km/h (40 mph)	1002 hPa (29.59 inHg)	Philippines, Borneo	$275,000	11	
Yagi	June 8 – 12, 2013	90	85 km/h (50 mph)	990 hPa (29.23 inHg)	Philippines, Japan	None	None	
Leepi	June 18 – 20, 2013	72	75 km/h (45 mph)	994 hPa (29.35 inHg)	Philippines, Taiwan, Ryukyu Islands, South Korea	None	None	
Bebinca	June 20 – 24, 2013	84	75 km/h (45 mph)	990 hPa (29.23 inHg)	South China, Vietnam	$53 million	1	
Cimaron	July 17 – 18, 2013	42	75 km/h (45 mph)	1000 hPa (29.53 inHg)	Philippines, Taiwan, East China	$322 million	6	
Mangkhut	August 6 – 7, 2013	36	75 km/h (45 mph)	992 hPa (29.29 inHg)	Vietnam, Cambodia, Laos	$56.1 million	4	
Unala	August 19, 2013	6	65 km/h (40 mph)	1000 hPa (29.53 inHg)	None	None	None	
Yutu	September 1, 2013	18	65 km/h (40 mph)	1002 hPa (29.59 inHg)	None	None	None	
Sepat	September 30 – October 2, 2013	66	75 km/h (45 mph)	992 hPa (29.29 inHg)	Japan	None	None	
Podul	November 14, 2013	12	65 km/h (40 mph)	1000 hPa (29.53 inHg)	Philippines, Indochina	$194 million	46	
Lingling	January 18 – 19, 2014	48	65 km/h (40 mph)	1002 hPa (29.59 inHg)	Philippines	$12.6 million	70	
Kajiki	January 31 – February 1, 2014	30	65 km/h (40 mph)	1000 hPa (29.53 inHg)	Philippines	$202,000	6	
Peipah	April 5, 2014	12	65 km/h (40 mph)	998 hPa (29.47 inHg)	Caroline Islands	None	None	
Mitag	June 11, 2014	24	75 km/h (45 mph)	994 hPa (29.35 inHg)	Philippines, Taiwan, Ryukyu Islands	None	None	
Hagibis	June 14 – 17, 2014	54†	75 km/h (45 mph)	996 hPa (29.41 inHg)	Philippines, China, Taiwan, Japan	$198 million	None	
Fung-wong	September 17 – 23, 2014	156	85 km/h (50 mph)	985 hPa (29.09 inHg)	Philippines, Taiwan, China, Japan, South Korea	$231 million	22	
Sinlaku	November 28 – 30, 2014	54	85 km/h (50 mph)	990 hPa (29.23 inHg)	Philippines, Vietnam, Cambodia	$4.26 million	4	
Jangmi	December 28 – 30, 2014	48	75 km/h (45 mph)	996 hPa (29.41 inHg)	Philippines, Borneo	$28.4 million	66	
Bavi	March 11 – 17, 2015	150	85 km/h (50 mph)	990 hPa (29.23 inHg)	Micronesia, Philippines	$2.25 million	9	
Kajiki	April 4 – 5, 2015	30	65 km/h (40 mph)	998 hPa (29.47 inHg)	Caroline Islands	$200,000	None	
Kujira	June 21 – 24, 2015	90	85 km/h (50 mph)	985 hPa (29.09 inHg)	Vietnam, South China	$16 million	9	
Molave	August 7 – 13, 2015	162	85 km/h (50 mph)	985 hPa (29.09 inHg)	None	None	None	
Vamco	September 13 – 15, 2015	30	65 km/h (40 mph)	998 hPa (29.47 inHg)	Indochina	$14.1 million	15	
Lupit	July 23 – 24, 2016	24	75 km/h (45 mph)	1000 hPa (29.53 inHg)	None	None	None	
Conson	August 9 – 14, 2016	144	85 km/h (50 mph)	985 hPa (29.09 inHg)	Japan	None	None	
Dianmu	August 17 – 19, 2016	42	75 km/h (45 mph)	980 hPa (28.94 inHg)	South China, Indochina	$570 million	23	
Kompasu	August 21 – 22, 2016	42	65 km/h (40 mph)	1000 hPa (29.53 inHg)	Japan, Russia Far East	None	1	
Malou	September 6, 2016	18	75 km/h (45 mph)	1000 hPa (29.53 inHg)	Ryukyu Islands	None	None	
Rai	September 12 – 13, 2016	30	65 km/h (40 mph)	996 hPa (29.41 inHg)	Indochina	$74 million	14	
Ma-on	November 10 – 11, 2016	48	65 km/h (40 mph)	1002 hPa (29.59 inHg)	None	None	None	
Muifa	April 25 – 27, 2017	36	65 km/h (40 mph)	1002 hPa (29.59 inHg)	None	None	None	
Kulap	July 21 – 25, 2017	108	75 km/h (45 mph)	998 hPa (29.47 inHg)	None	None	None	
Roke	July 22 – 23, 2017	24	65 km/h (40 mph)	1002 hPa (29.59 inHg)	Philippines, Taiwan, South China	None	None	
Sonca	July 23 – 25, 2017	60	65 km/h (40 mph)	1000 hPa (29.53 inHg)	South China, Vietnam, Cambodia	$313 million	37	
Haitang	July 28 – 31, 2017	60	85 km/h (50 mph)	985 hPa (29.09 inHg)	Taiwan, East China	$3.43 million	None	
Nalgae	August 2 – 5, 2017	90	85 km/h (50 mph)	990 hPa (29.23 inHg)	None	None	None	
Guchol	September 5 – 6, 2017	90	65 km/h (40 mph)	1000 hPa (29.53 inHg)	Philippines, Taiwan	None	None	
Haikui	November 10 – 12, 2017	54	75 km/h (45 mph)	998 hPa (29.47 inHg)	Philippines, South China, Vietnam	$4.26 million	None	
Kirogi	November 18, 2017	24	65 km/h (40 mph)	1000 hPa (29.53 inHg)	Philippines, Malaysia, Vietnam	$10 million	10	
Kai-tak	December 14 – 21, 2017	96†	75 km/h (45 mph)	994 hPa (29.35 inHg)	Philippines, Malaysia, Vietnam	$74.3 million	83	
Bolaven	January 3, 2018	24	65 km/h (40 mph)	1002 hPa (29.59 inHg)	Philippines, Vietnam	$11.1 million	3	
Sanba	February 11 – 13, 2018	48	65 km/h (40 mph)	1000 hPa (29.53 inHg)	Caroline Islands, Philippines	$3.23 million	14	
Ewiniar	June 5 – 8, 2018	90	75 km/h (45 mph)	998 hPa (29.47 inHg)	Philippines, Vietnam, South China, Vietnam	$842 million	13	
Gaemi	June 15 – 16, 2018	48	85 km/h (50 mph)	990 hPa (29.23 inHg)	Taiwan, Ryukyu Islands	None	3	
Son-Tinh	July 17 – 18, 2018	48	75 km/h (45 mph)	994 hPa (29.35 inHg)	Philippines, South China, Vietnam, Laos, Thailand	$323 million	173	
Yagi	August 8 – 12, 2018	120	75 km/h (45 mph)	990 hPa (29.23 inHg)	Philippines, Taiwan, Ryukyu Islands, East China	$386 million	8	
Bebinca	August 13 – 17, 2018	102	85 km/h (50 mph)	985 hPa (29.09 inHg)	South China, Indochina	$391 million	19	
Hector	August 13 – 15, 2018	42	75 km/h (45 mph)	998 hPa (29.48 inHg)	None	None	None	
Rumbia	August 15 – 17, 2018	66	85 km/h (50 mph)	985 hPa (29.09 inHg)	Ryukyu Islands, East China, Korean Peninsula	$5.36 billion	53	
Barijat	September 11 – 13, 2018	54	75 km/h (45 mph)	998 hPa (29.47 inHg)	Philippines, Taiwan, South China, Vietnam	$7.3 million	None	
Toraji	November 17, 2018	18	65 km/h (40 mph)	1004 hPa (29.65 inHg)	Vietnam	$53.6 million	20	
Pabuk	January 1 – 4, 2019	84	85 km/h (50 mph)	996 hPa (29.41 inHg)	Philippines	$157 million	10	
Sepat	June 27 – 28, 2019	18	75 km/h (45 mph)	994 hPa (29.35 inHg)	Japan	None	None	
Mun	July 2 – 4, 2019	48	65 km/h (40 mph)	992 hPa (29.29 inHg)	South China, Vietnam, Laos	$4.25 million	2	
Danas	July 16 – 20, 2019	108	85 km/h (50 mph)	985 hPa (29.09 inHg)	Philippines, Taiwan, East China, Ryukyu Islands, Korean Peninsula	$6.42 million	6	
Nari	July 25 – 27, 2019	42	65 km/h (40 mph)	998 hPa (29.47 inHg)	Japan	$202,000	6	
Wipha	July 30 – August 3, 2019	90	85 km/h (50 mph)	1000 hPa (29.53 inHg)	South China, Vietnam, Laos	$76.8 million	27	
Podul	August 28 – 29, 2019	48	75 km/h (45 mph)	992 hPa (29.29 inHg)	Philippines, Vietnam, Laos	$19.2 million	14	
Kajiki	September 2 – 3, 2019	24	65 km/h (40 mph)	996 hPa (29.41 inHg)	Philippines, South China, Vietnam, Laos	$76.2 million	10	
Peipah	September 15 – 16, 2019	36	65 km/h (40 mph)	1000 hPa (29.53 inHg)	Mariana Islands	None	None	

=== 2020s ===
Name	System dates	Duration (hours)	Sustained wind speeds	Pressure	Areas affected	Damage (USD)	Deaths	Refs
Nuri	June 12 – 13, 2020	36	75 km/h (45 mph)	996 hPa (29.41 inHg)	Philippines, South China	None	1	
Sinlaku	August 1 – 2, 2020	42	75 km/h (40 mph)	985 hPa (29.09 inHg)	South China	$12.9 million	4	
Jangmi	August 8 – 11, 2020	66	85 km/h (50 mph)	994 hPa (29.35 inHg)	Ryukyu Islands, Korean Peninsula	$1 million	None	
Noul	September 15 – 18, 2020	72	85 km/h (50 mph)	992 hPa (29.29 inHg)	Philippines, Indochina	$175 million	18	
Linfa	October 10 – 11, 2020	18	85 km/h (50 mph)	994 hPa (29.35 inHg)	Philippines, Indochina	$217 million	138	
Nangka	October 12 – 14, 2020	54	85 km/h (50 mph)	990 hPa (29.23 inHg)	Philippines, South China, Vietnam	$29.4 million	4	
Etau	November 8 – 10, 2020	42	85 km/h (50 mph)	992 hPa (29.29 inHg)	Philippines, Vietnam, Laos	$34.8 million	3	
Krovanh	December 20 – 22, 2020	54	65 km/h (40 mph)	1000 hPa (29.53 inHg)	Philippines	$4.48 million	9	
Dujuan	February 18 – 21, 2021	84	75 km/h (45 mph)	996 hPa (29.41 inHg)	Palau, Philippines	$3.29 million	1	
Choi-wan	May 30 – June 5, 2021	132	75 km/h (45 mph)	998 hPa (29.47 inHg)	Philippines, Taiwan	$6.39 million	11	
Koguma	June 11 – 13, 2021	36	65 km/h (40 mph)	996 hPa (29.41 inHg)	South China, Vietnam, Laos	$12.9 million	1	
Nepartak	July 23 – 28, 2021	114	75 km/h (45 mph)	990 hPa (29.23 inHg)	Japan	None	None	
Lupit	August 4 – 8, 2021	120	75 km/h (45 mph)	984 hPa (29.06 inHg)	China, Taiwan, Ryukyu Islands, Japan	$267 million	6	
Omais	August 20 – 23, 2021	84	85 km/h (50 mph)	994 hPa (29.35 inHg)	Marshall Islands, Mariana Islands, Ryukyu Islands, South Korea	$13 million	None	
Dianmu	September 23, 2021	12	65 km/h (40 mph)	1000 hPa (29.53 inHg)	Vietnam, Laos	Unknown	8	
Lionrock	October 7 – 10, 2021	60	65 km/h (40 mph)	994 hPa (29.35 inHg)	Philippines, South China, Vietnam	$47 million	6	
Megi	April 9 – 10, 2022	30	75 km/h (45 mph)	996 hPa (29.41 inHg)	Philippines	$200 million	214	
Aere	June 30 – July 4, 2022	102	85 km/h (50 mph)	994 hPa (29.35 inHg)	Japan	Unknown	None	
Songda	July 28 – 31, 2022	78	75 km/h (45 mph)	1000 hPa (29.53 inHg)	Japan, South Korea	None	None	
Trases	July 31 – August 1, 2022	36	65 km/h (40 mph)	998 hPa (29.47 inHg)	Ryukyu Islands, South Korea	None	None	
Mulan	August 9 – 10, 2022	42	65 km/h (40 mph)	994 hPa (29.35 inHg)	South China, Vietnam	$1.43 million	7	
Meari	August 11 – 14, 2022	72	75 km/h (45 mph)	996 hPa (29.41 inHg)	Japan	Unknown	None	
Talas	September 22 – 23, 2022	36	65 km/h (40 mph)	1000 hPa (29.53 inHg)	Japan	Unknown	3	
Sonca	October 14 , 2022	24	65 km/h (40 mph)	998 hPa (29.47 inHg)	Vietnam, Laos, Cambodia	$102 million	10	
Haitang	October 18 – 19, 2022	36	65 km/h (40 mph)	1004 hPa (29.53 inHg)	None	None	None	
Banyan	October 30 – 31, 2022	30	75 km/h (45 mph)	1002 hPa (29.59 inHg)	None	None	None	
Yamaneko	November 12 – 14, 2022	42	65 km/h (40 mph)	1004 hPa (29.65 inHg)	None	None	None	
Pakhar	December 11 – 12, 2022	24	75 km/h (45 mph)	998 hPa (29.47 inHg)	Philippines	Minimal	8	
Sanvu	April 20 – 21, 2023	36	85 km/h (50 mph)	996 hPa (29.41 inHg)	Federated States of Micronesia	None	None	
Kirogi	August 30 – September 2, 2023	84	85 km/h (50 mph)	994 hPa (29.35 inHg)	Japan	None	None	
Yun-yeung	September 5 – 8, 2023	72	85 km/h (50 mph)	994 hPa (29.35 inHg)	Japan	$300 million	3	
Sanba	October 18 – 19, 2023		75 km/h (45 mph)	1000 hPa (29.53 inHg)	Vietnam, South China	$616 million	7	
Jelawat	December 17, 2023		75 km/h (45 mph)	1000 hPa (29.53 inHg)	Philippines	$43,200	0 (1)	
Malikski	May 30, 2024		65 km/h (40 mph)	998 hPa (29.47 inHg)	South China, Taiwan	None	None	
Son-Tinh	August 11-14, 2024		75 km/h (45 mph)	994 hPa (29.35 inHg)	Alaska	None	None	
Wukong	August 12-15, 2024		65 km/h (40 mph)	1002 hPa (29.59 inHg)	None	None	None	
Jongdari	August 18-20, 2024		75 km/h (45 mph)	996 hPa (29.41 inHg)	Miyako Islands, Yaeyama Islands, Korean Peninsula, Northeast China	$2.15 billion	28	
Leepi	September 2-7, 2024		65 km/h (40 mph)	1002 hPa (29.59 inHg)	None	None	None	
Pulasan	September 15-21, 2024		85 km/h (50 mph)	992 hPa (29.29 inHg)	Guam, Northern Mariana Islands, Philippines, East China, South Korea, Japan	$4.15 million	17	
Soulik	September 19, 2024		65 km/h (40 mph)	992 hPa (29.29 inHg)	Philippines, Vietnam, Laos, Thailand, Cambodia, Myanmar	$33.7 million	29	
Cimaron	September 25-27, 2024		65 km/h (40 mph)	998 hPa (29.47 inHg)	None	None	None	
Barijat	October 9-11, 2024		85 km/h (50 mph)	985 hPa (29.09 inHg)	Guam, Northern Mariana Islands, Kuril Islands, Kamchatka Peninsula	None	None	
Pabuk	December 23-25, 2024		65 km/h (40 mph)	1000 hPa (29.53 inHg)	East Malaysia, Philippines, Vietnam	$9.91 million	4	
Sepat	June 23-24, 2025		65 km/h (40 mph)	1004 hPa (29.65 inHg)	Bonin Islands, Izu Islands, Kantō region	None	None	
Nari	July 12-15, 2025		85 km/h (50 mph)	990 hPa (29.23 inHg)	Japan, Alaska	$1 million	None	
Francisco	July 23-24, 2025		75 km/h (45 mph)	990 hPa (29.23 inHg)	Philippines, Ryukyu Islands, Taiwan, Eastern China	Unknown	Unknown	
Bailu	August 3-4, 2025		65 km/h (40 mph)	994 hPa (29.35 inHg)	Ryukyu Islands, Izu Islands, Alaska	Minimal	None	
Lingling	August 20-21, 2025		85 km/h (50 mph)	994 hPa (29.35 inHg)	Philippines, Ryukyu Islands, Kyūshū	Unknown	None	
Nongfa	August 30-31, 2025		75 km/h (45 mph)	996 hPa (29.41 inHg)	Philippines, Southern China, Vietnam, Laos, Cambodia, Thailand, Myanmar	$12,076	1	
Peipah	September 4-5, 2025		85 km/h (50 mph)	992 hPa (29.29 inHg)	Ryukyu Islands, West Japan, East Japan	$150 million	1	
Nokaen	January 15-19, 2026		75 km/h (45 mph)	996 hPa (29.41 inHg)	Caroline Islands, Philippines	$24,000	2	
Penha	February 4-6, 2026		65 km/h (40 mph)	1000 hPa (29.53 inHg)	Caroline Islands, Philippines	$25.5 million	12	

== Climatology ==
Tropical storms by month
Month	Number of storms
January	8
February	5
March	3
April	12
May	9
June	30
July	39
August	71
September	51
October	33
November	29
December	16

Tropical storms by decade
Period	Number of storms
1977–79	20
1980s	56
1990s	67
2000s	54
2010s	74
2020s	33

== See also ==
- Typhoon
- Pacific typhoon season
- 2026 Pacific typhoon season
