= Tropical Storm Yun-yeung =

Pacific tropical storm in 2023

Tropical Storm Yun-yeung (Ineng)
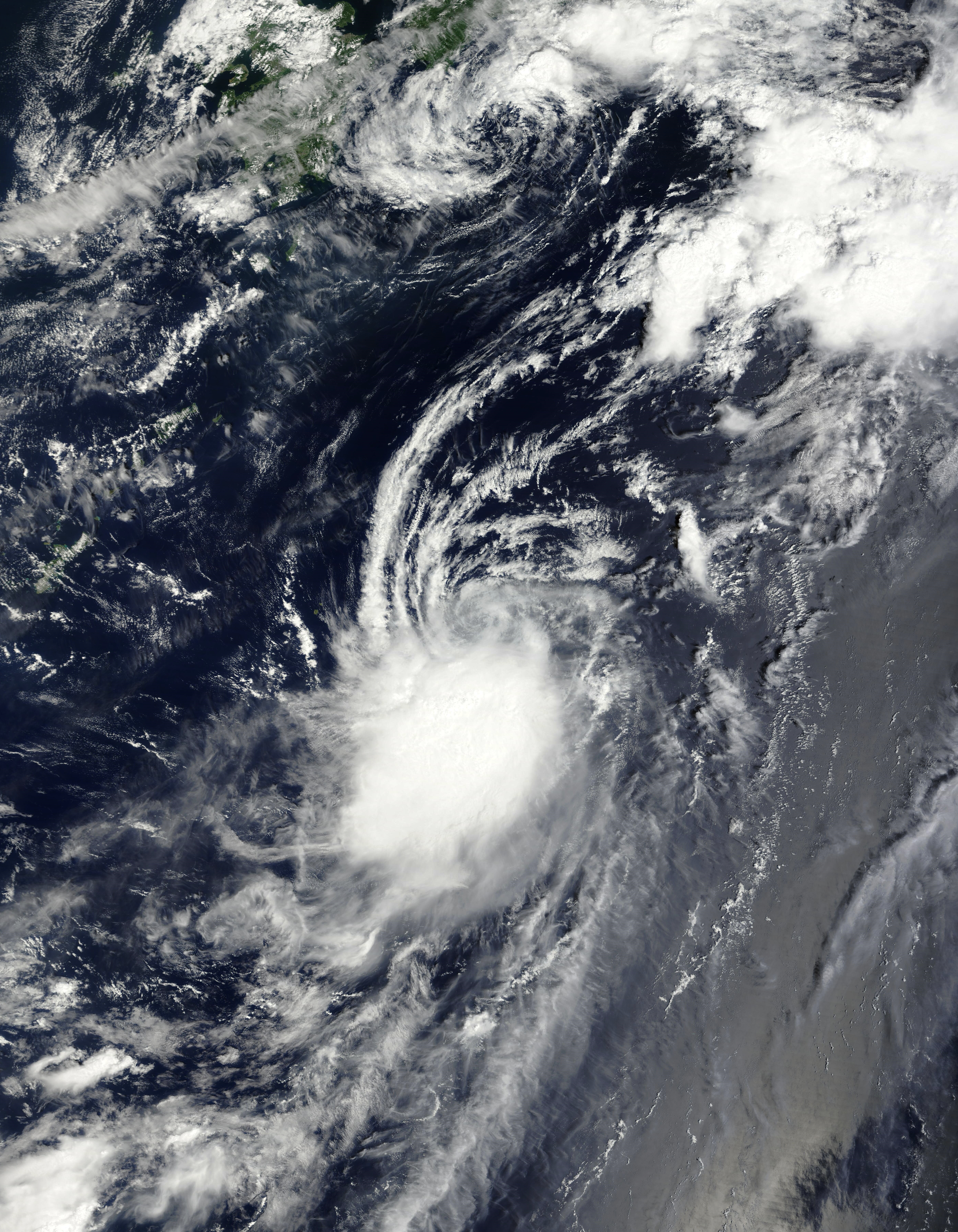
- Yun-yeung near its peak intensity as it neared Japan on September 7

Meteorological history
- Formed: September 4, 2023
- Extratropical: September 8, 2023
- Dissipated: September 9, 2023

Tropical storm
- 10-minute sustained (JMA)
- Highest winds: 75 km/h (45 mph)
- Lowest pressure: 998 hPa (mbar); 29.47 inHg

Tropical storm
- 1-minute sustained (SSHWS/JTWC)
- Highest winds: 85 km/h (50 mph)
- Lowest pressure: 991 hPa (mbar); 29.26 inHg

Overall effects
- Fatalities: 3
- Damage: $300 million (2023 USD)
- Areas affected: Philippines, Japan
- IBTrACS
- Part of the 2023 Pacific typhoon season

Tropical Storm Yun-yeung, (Note: The name Yun-yeung (Cantonese: 鴛鴦, [jyːn˥ jœːŋ˥]) was contributed by Hong Kong and it refers to the mandarin duck (Aix galericulata) in Cantonese and a popular drink that is made with coffee and milk tea.) known in the Philippines as Tropical Storm Ineng was a weak tropical storm which affected Japan in early September 2023. It is the twentieth tropical depression and thirteenth tropical storm of the 2023 Pacific typhoon season, Yun-yeung originated in the Philippine Sea in early September. After exiting the Philippine Area of Responsibility on September 5, it developed into a depression the next day. On September 7, Yun-yeung would peak as a minimal tropical storm before making landfall in Southern Japan. It rapidly weakened once inland, and by September 9, had degenerated into a remnant low.

Despite being weak when affecting the Philippines and Japan, Yun-yeung still produced historical amounts of rainfall in Japan, causing floods and landslides to occur in Southern Japan. A total of three fatalities would be recorded, all in Chiba Prefecture. Total losses are at US$300 million according to Gallagher Re.

== Meteorological history ==
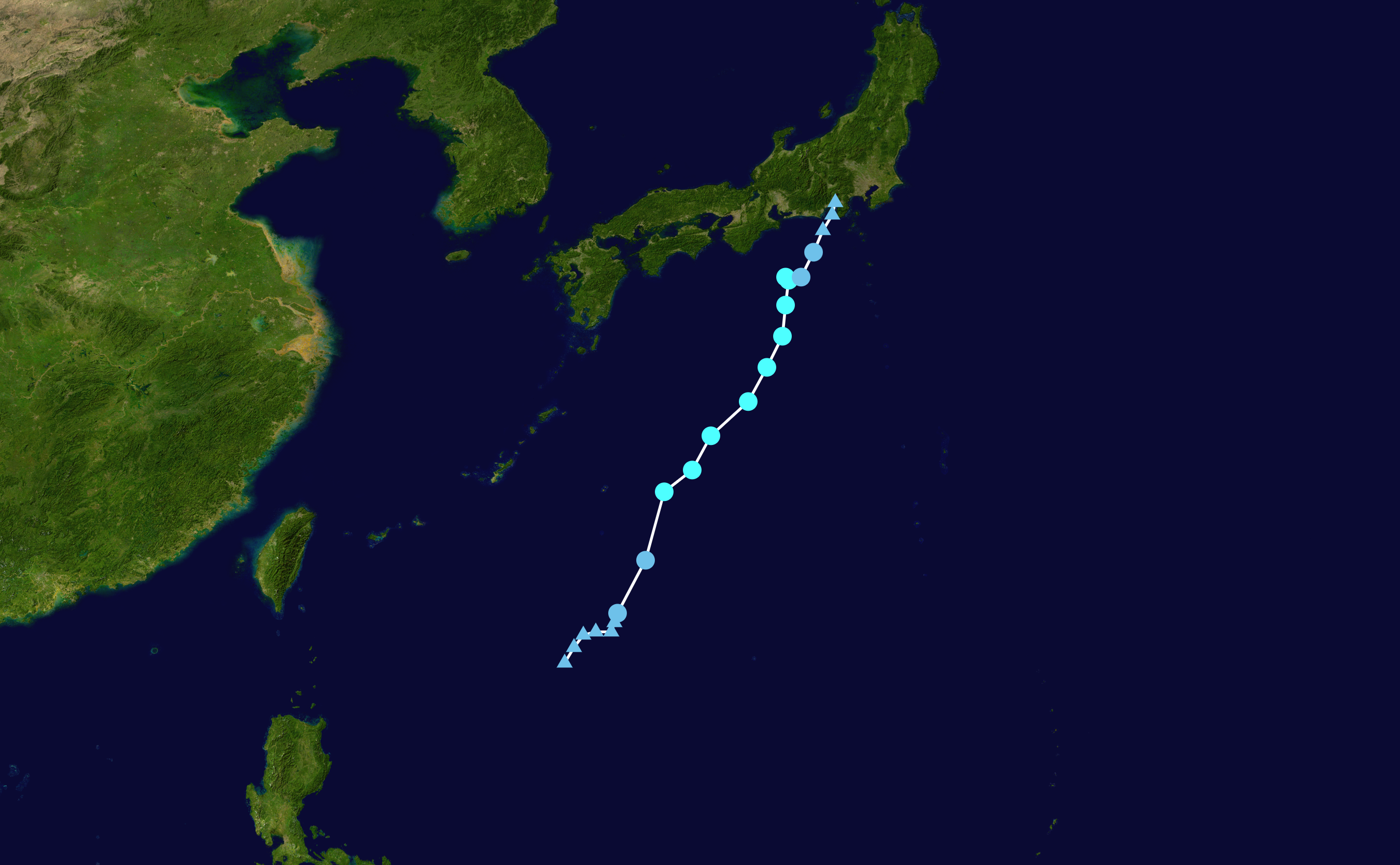
Map plotting the storm's track and intensity, according to the Saffir–Simpson scale Map key Saffir–Simpson scale Tropical depression (≤38 mph, ≤62 km/h) Tropical storm (39–73 mph, 63–118 km/h) Category 1 (74–95 mph, 119–153 km/h) Category 2 (96–110 mph, 154–177 km/h) Category 3 (111–129 mph, 178–208 km/h) Category 4 (130–156 mph, 209–251 km/h) Category 5 (≥157 mph, ≥252 km/h) Unknown Storm type Tropical cyclone Subtropical cyclone Extratropical cyclone, remnant low, tropical disturbance, or monsoon depression

On 6:00 UTC on September 4, the Joint Typhoon Warning Center (JTWC) began tracking a low-pressure area far east of Luzon. As the disturbance was in a favorable environment with low vertical wind shear and warm SSTs of 29–30 °C (84–86 °F), the JTWC issued a Tropical Cyclone Formation Alert (TCFA) on the system a day later. Soon after, the Japan Meteorological Agency (JMA) stated that the disturbance had developed into a tropical depression due to Dvorak readings. At the time, the disturbance was located in the Philippine Area of Responsibility (PAR), causing the Philippine Atmospheric, Geophysical, and Astronomical Services Administration (PAGASA) to designate the system as a tropical depression, naming it Ineng.

Tracking northwestward due to the influence of a subtropical ridge, on 18:00 UTC on September 5, both the JTWC and JMA recognized the system as a tropical cyclone, with the latter agency naming it Yun-yeung as according to them, it had gale-force winds at the time. The next day, the JTWC upgraded Yun-yeung into a tropical storm. Later that day, the depression exited the PAR, causing PAGASA to cease advisories on the system. Yun-yeung steadily intensified, and early on September 7, the JMA's surface observations and Dvorak intensity estimates revealed that it had peaked with 10-minute sustained winds of 70 km/h (45 mph).

Due to a binary interaction with the remnants of Kirogi, Yun-yeung began to slow down and track slightly south, crossing into an environment with wind shear in excess of 70 km/h (45 mph). Despite that, due to the system's diffluent outflow, conditions were still favorable for the system to intensify. As a result, later that day, it peaked with 1-minute sustained winds of 80 km/h (50 mph) according to the JTWC. It began drifting eastward instead of north-eastward, rapidly weakening due to the increasing shear. On September 8, Yun-yeung made landfall as a weak tropical depression along the northern shoreline of Suruga Bay, degenerating into a wave-like feature. The JTWC kept monitoring it until it had degenerated into a remnant low the net day.

== Preparations and impact ==
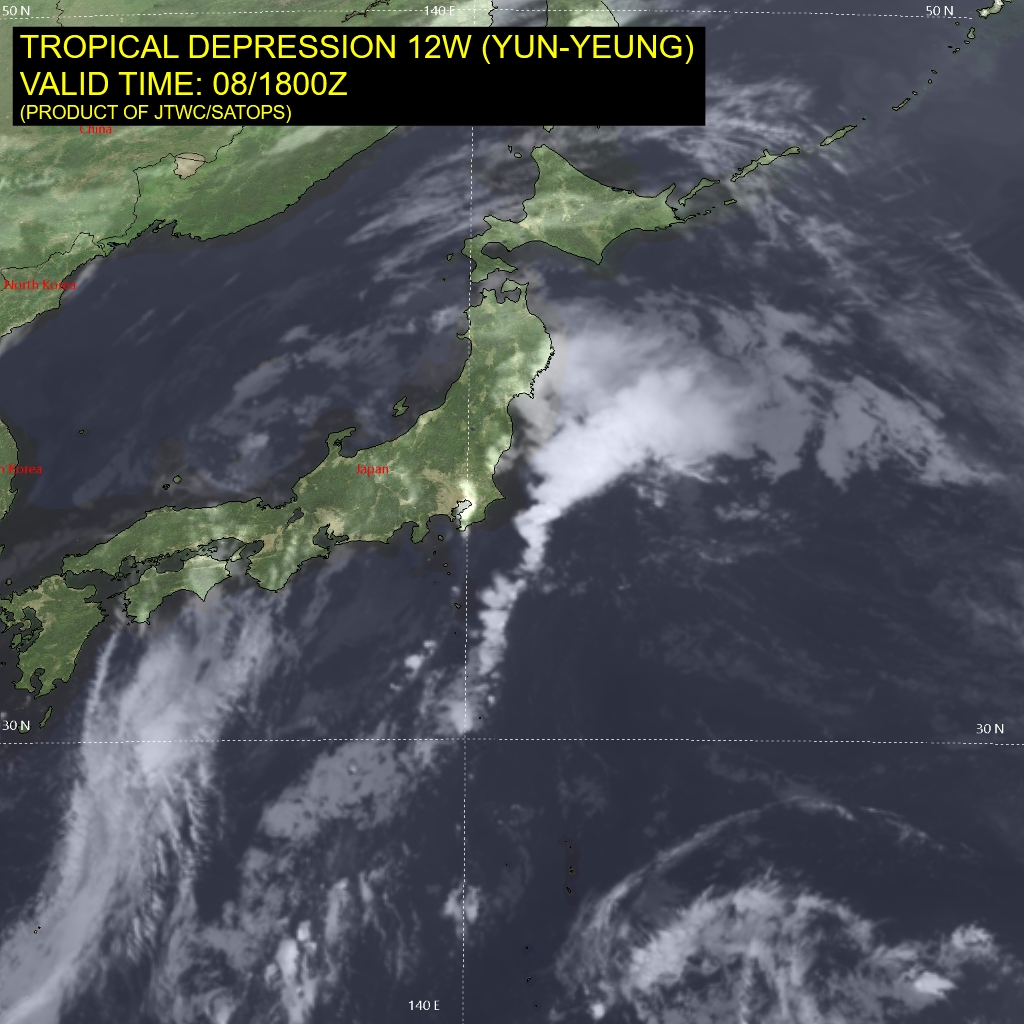
Yun-yeung weakening off the coast of Japan on September 8

=== Philippines ===
When Yun-yeung was initially developing far from the Philippines, it with Haikui primarily enhanced the southwest monsoon, causing heavy rains in portions of Luzon. PAGASA issued a gale warning for the seaboards of portions of Northern Luzon due to the system. Yun-yeung itself caused scattered showers in Batanes, Abra, Apayao, Cagayan and Isabela.

=== Japan ===
In the Chiba and Ibaraki prefectures, heavy rain was recorded, with record high levels of rain (371.5 mm (14.63 in) in Mobara and 249.5 mm (9.82 in) in Kamogawa) seen on September 8. Some train lines were impacted in the Kanto region, since JR East suspended some lines and limited express trains. Additionally, rides in the Tokaido Line, Uchibo Line and Gaibo Line were temporarily suspended. Osaka recorded 323 mm (12.7 in) of rainfall. Due to the storm, nearly 10,000 households had temporarily lost power in Japan. Additionally, 32 local flights had to be cancelled due to Yun-yeung.

In Shinjuku Station, water leaked in an underground passage and flooded around 15 meters (49 ft) of walkway. Over 2,800 homes suffered some damage, while 77 buildings were flooded. A total of 19 houses were destroyed. In Iwaki alone, 9 rivers overflowed their banks while at least 7 cars were submerged, Economic losses from the storm were in the tens of millions according to Aon. A total of 3 people died due to the storm. These were an elderly man who fell into a drainage ditch in Iwaki, a young man who drowned in a river, and a police officer who fell off a building.
