= List of Western Pacific tropical depressions =

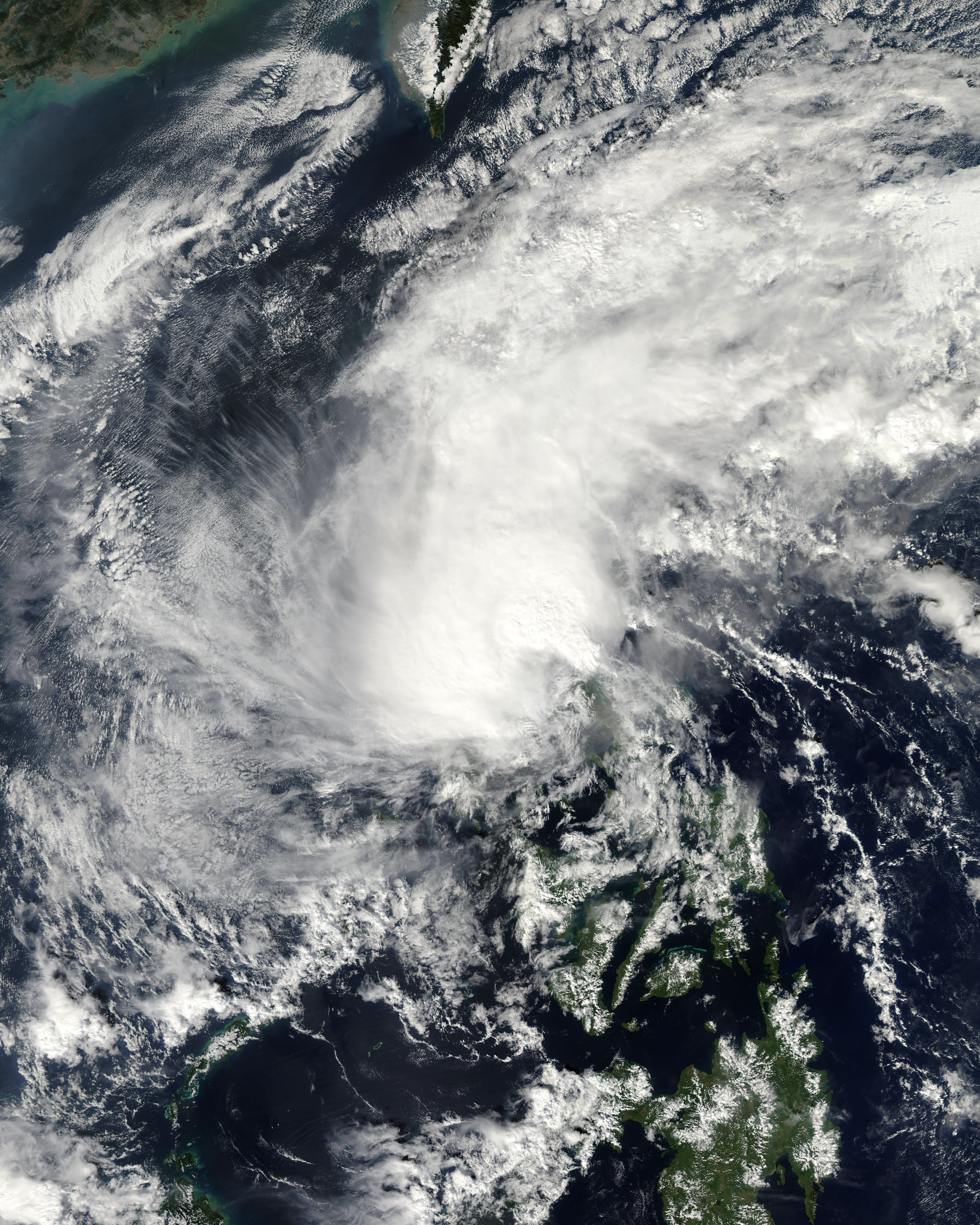
Tropical Depression Winnie, a deadly tropical depression that impacted the Philippines in November 2004

A tropical depression is a tropical cyclone that reaches maximum sustained winds below 34 knots (39 mph; 63 km/h). The Japan Meteorological Agency (JMA) is the main weather forecasting agency in the Pacific Northwest Pacific basin, where it measures sustained winds by averaging wind speeds in a period of ten minutes. The basin is limited to the north of the equator between the 100th meridian east and the 180th meridian.

== Background ==
RSMC Tokyo's Tropical Cyclone Intensity Scale
Category	Sustained winds
Violent Typhoon	≥105 knots ≥194 km/h
Very Strong Typhoon	85–104 knots 157–193 km/h
Typhoon	64–84 knots 118–156 km/h
Severe Tropical Storm	48–63 knots 89–117 km/h
Tropical Storm	34–47 knots 62–88 km/h
Tropical Depression	≤33 knots ≤61 km/h

The Northwest Pacific basin covers a vast area in the Pacific Ocean, located north of the equator, between 100°E and 180°E. Several weather agencies monitor this basin, however it is officially monitored by the Japan Meteorological Agency (JMA, RSMC Tokyo), who is responsible for forecasting, naming and issuing warnings for tropical cyclones. Unofficially, the Joint Typhoon Warning Center also monitors the basin, however these warnings measures 1-minute sustained wind speeds, comparing their scale to the Saffir–Simpson scale. The JMA uses a simpler scale on classifying tropical cyclones adapted by the ESCAP/WMO Typhoon Committee measuring 10-minute sustained wind speeds, ranging from a tropical depression, tropical storm, severe tropical storm and typhoon. Furthermore, the JMA divides the typhoon category into three sub-categories for domestic purposes – a strong typhoon, very strong typhoon and violent typhoon.

This article covers a list of systems developing in the Northwest Pacific basin that were classified by the category of a tropical depression by the JMA, JTWC and PAGASA. The category of a tropical depression ranges with sustained winds of below 34 knots (63 km/h; 39 mph). Just to note that this article only lists tropical depressions that were named, designated and systems that affected any land masses.

== Systems ==
=== 1980s ===
Name	System dates	Sustained wind speeds	Pressure	Areas affected	Damage (USD)	Deaths	Refs
Atring	January 26 - 28, 1989	55 km/h (35 mph)	1002 hPa (29.59 inHg)	Philippines	$5 million	61	

=== 1990s ===
Name	System dates	Sustained wind speeds	Pressure	Areas affected	Damage (USD)	Deaths	Refs
Hilda (Auring)	January 3 - 8, 1999	55 km/h (35 mph)	1000 hPa (29.53 inHg)	Malaysia	$1.3 million	5	

=== 2000s ===
Name	System dates	Sustained wind speeds	Pressure	Areas affected	Damage (USD)	Deaths	Refs
Auring	January 3 - 6, 2009	45 km/h (30 mph)	1000 hPa (29.53 inHg)	Philippines	$498,318	2	

=== 2010s ===
Name	System dates	Sustained wind speeds	Pressure	Areas affected	Damage (USD)	Deaths	Refs
04W	May 10 - 15, 2018	55 km/h (35 mph)	1008 hPa (29.77 inHg)	None	None	None	
Josie	July 20 - 23, 2018	55 km/h (35 mph)	996 hPa (29.41 inHg)	Philippines, Taiwan	$87.4 million	16	
24W (Luis)	August 21 - 26, 2018	55 km/h (35 mph)	996 hPa (29.41 inHg)	Taiwan, East China	$34 million	7	
01W (Amang)	January 4 – 22, 2019	55 km/h (35 mph)	1004 hPa (29.65 inHg)	Kiribati, Marshall Islands, Caroline Islands, Philippines	$6.04 million	10	
03W (Chedeng)	March 14 - 19, 2019	<55 km/h (35 mph)	1006 hPa (29.71 inHg)	Caroline Islands, Philippines	$23 thousand	None	
TD	May 7 - 8, 2019	Not specified	1004 hPa (29.65 inHg)	Yap, Palau	None	None	
TD	May 7 - 15, 2019	Not specified	1006 hPa (29.71 inHg)	Caroline Islands	None	None	
TD	May 10 - 11, 2019	Not specified	1008 hPa (29.77 inHg)	None	None	None	
TD	June 26, 2019	55 km/h (35 mph)	1002 hPa (29.59 inHg)	Japan, Korean Peninsula	None	None	
04W (Egay)	June 27 - July 1, 2019	<55 km/h (35 mph)	1002 hPa (29.59 inHg)	Yap, Philippines, Taiwan, East China	None	None	
Goring	July 17 - 19, 2019	55 km/h (35 mph)	996 hPa (29.41 inHg)	Philippines, Taiwan, Ryukyu Islands	None	None	
TD	August 6 - 8, 2019	55 km/h (35 mph)	994 hPa (29.35 inHg)	Philippines	None	None	
TD	August 17 - 18, 2019	Not specified	1006 hPa (29.71 inHg)	None	None	None	
TD	August 19 - 21, 2019	Not specified	1004 hPa (29.65 inHg)	Ryukyu Islands, Taiwan, East China	None	None	
TD	September 1 - 2, 2019	55 km/h (35 mph)	1000 hPa (29.53 inHg)	Philippines	None	None	
TD	September 4 - 5, 2019	Not specified	1006 hPa (29.71 inHg)	Caroline Islands	None	None	
TD	September 7 - 10, 2019	55 km/h (35 mph)	1000 hPa (29.53 inHg)	Ryukyu Islands, Korean Peninsula	None	None	
Marilyn	September 10 - 13, 2019	55 km/h (35 mph)	996 hPa (29.41 inHg)	None	None	None	
TD	September 15, 2019	Not specified	996 hPa (29.41 inHg)	Japan	None	None	
TD	September 17, 2019	Not specified	1004 hPa (29.65 inHg)	Philippines	None	None	
TD	October 1 - 3, 2019	Not specified	1008 hPa (29.77 inHg)	None	None	None	
TD	October 21 - 22, 2019	Not specified	1008 hPa (29.77 inHg)	None	None	None	
TD	November 26 - 28, 2019	55 km/h (35 mph)	1002 hPa (29.59 hPa)	Mariana Islands	None	None	
TD	November 28 - December 1 , 2019	55 km/h (35 mph)	1002 hPa (29.59 hPa)	Caroline Islands	None	None	

=== 2020s ===
Name	System dates	Sustained wind speeds	Pressure	Areas affected	Damage (USD)	Deaths	Refs
Carina	July 11 – 15, 2020	<55 km/h (35 mph)	1004 hPa (29.65 inHg)	Philippines, Taiwan	None	None	
TD	July 27 – 29, 2020	Not specified	1010 hPa (29.83 inHg)	None	None	None	
Gener	August 9 – 13, 2020	55 km/h (35 mph)	1012 hPa (29.83 inHg)	None	None	None	
12W	September 10 – 12, 2020	55 km/h (35 mph)	1006 hPa (29.71 inHg)	Japan	None	None	
TD	September 27 – 29, 2020	Not specified	1000 hPa (29.53 inHg)	None	None	None	
Ofel	October 13 – 16, 2020	55 km/h (35 mph)	1002 hPa (29.65 inHg)	Philippines, Vietnam	$187,000	None	
20W	October 19 – 23, 2020	55 km/h (35 mph)	1006 hPa (29.71 inHg)	None	None	None	
TD	December 5 – 6, 2020	Not specified	1010 hPa (29.83 inHg)	None	None	None	
TD	December 29, 2020	Not specified	1004 hPa (29.65 inHg)	None	None	None	
TD	January 19 – 20, 2021	<55 km/h (35 mph)	1008 hPa (29.77 inHg)	Philippines	$10.8 million	1	

== See also ==
- Typhoon
- Pacific typhoon season
- 2026 Pacific typhoon season
