= Tropical Storm Sonca (2022) =

Pacific tropical storm in 2022

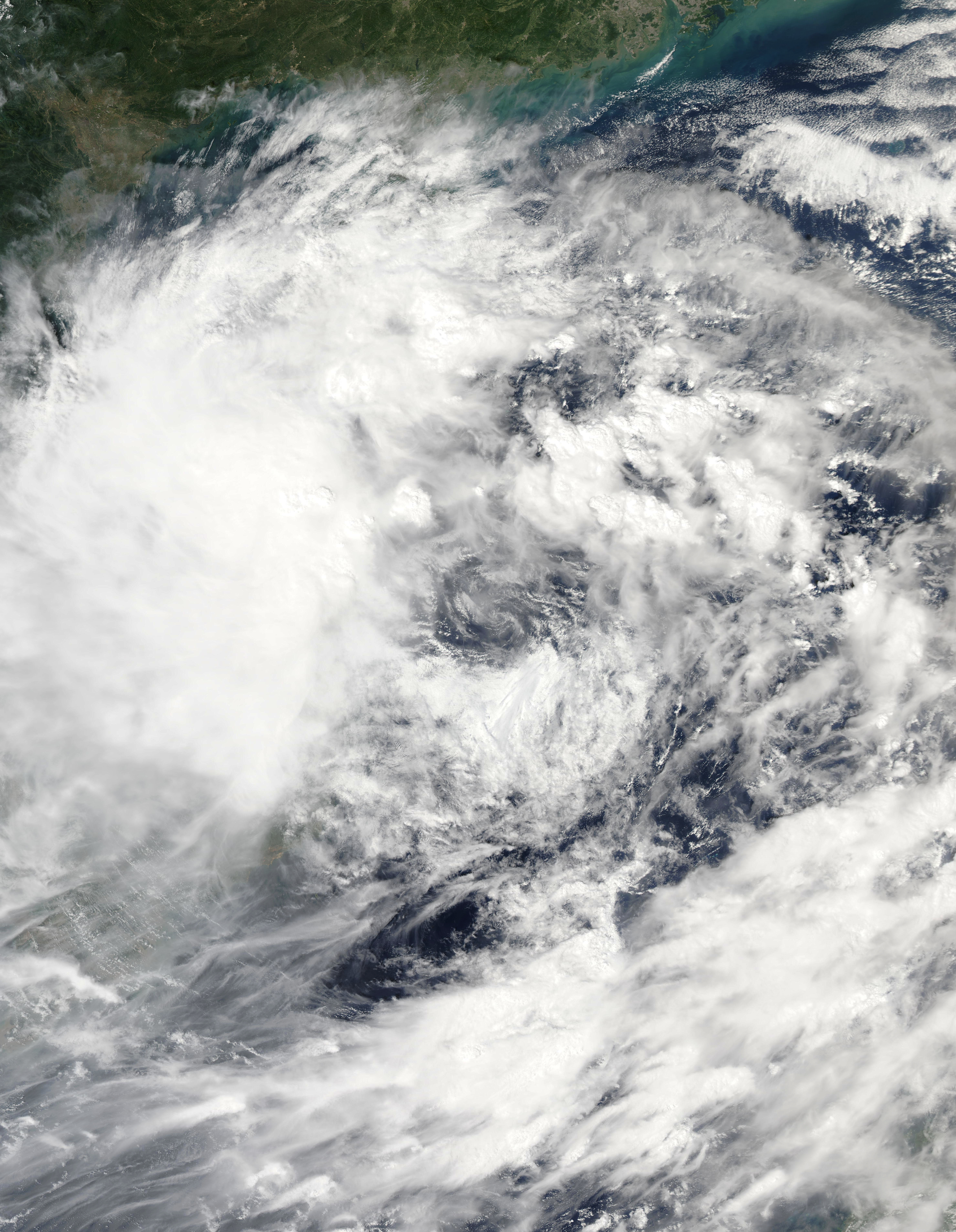
- Sonca as a tropical storm on October 14

Meteorological history
- Formed: October 13, 2022
- Dissipated: October 15, 2022

Tropical storm
- 10-minute sustained (JMA)
- Highest winds: 65 km/h (40 mph)
- Lowest pressure: 998 hPa (mbar); 29.47 inHg

Tropical storm
- 1-minute sustained (SSHWS/JTWC)
- Highest winds: 75 km/h (45 mph)
- Lowest pressure: 998 hPa (mbar); 29.47 inHg

Overall effects
- Fatalities: 12
- Damage: $102 million (2022 USD)
- Areas affected: Vietnam, Laos, Cambodia
- Part of the 2022 Pacific typhoon season

Tropical Storm Sonca, (Note: The name Sonca (Vietnamese: sơn ca, [səːn˧˧ kaː˧˧]) was contributed by Vietnam and refers to the Oriental skylark (Alauda gulgula) in Vietnamese.) was a weak but damaging tropical storm that impacted Vietnam in mid-October 2022. The thirtieth tropical depression, and nineteenth tropical storm of the 2022 Pacific typhoon season, Sonca developed from a scattered area of convection within a broad low-level center. As it became slightly organized, the Japan Meteorological Agency (JMA) classified the system as a depression on October 13, while the Joint Typhoon Warning Center (JTWC) followed suit the next day, naming the system 22W. Not long after, the system intensified into a tropical storm, receiving the name Sonca by the JMA. It soon made landfall on Da Nang, Vietnam. Sonca rapidly weakened over land, and the JTWC and JMA both issued their final advisories on Sonca.

Sonca, despite being weak caused heavy damage throughout central Vietnam, bringing 700 mm (28 in) of rainfall resulting in major flooding. Overall, Sonca was blamed for 12 fatalities, and damages inflicted costed 2.4 trillion VND (US$101.5 million.)

== Meteorological history ==
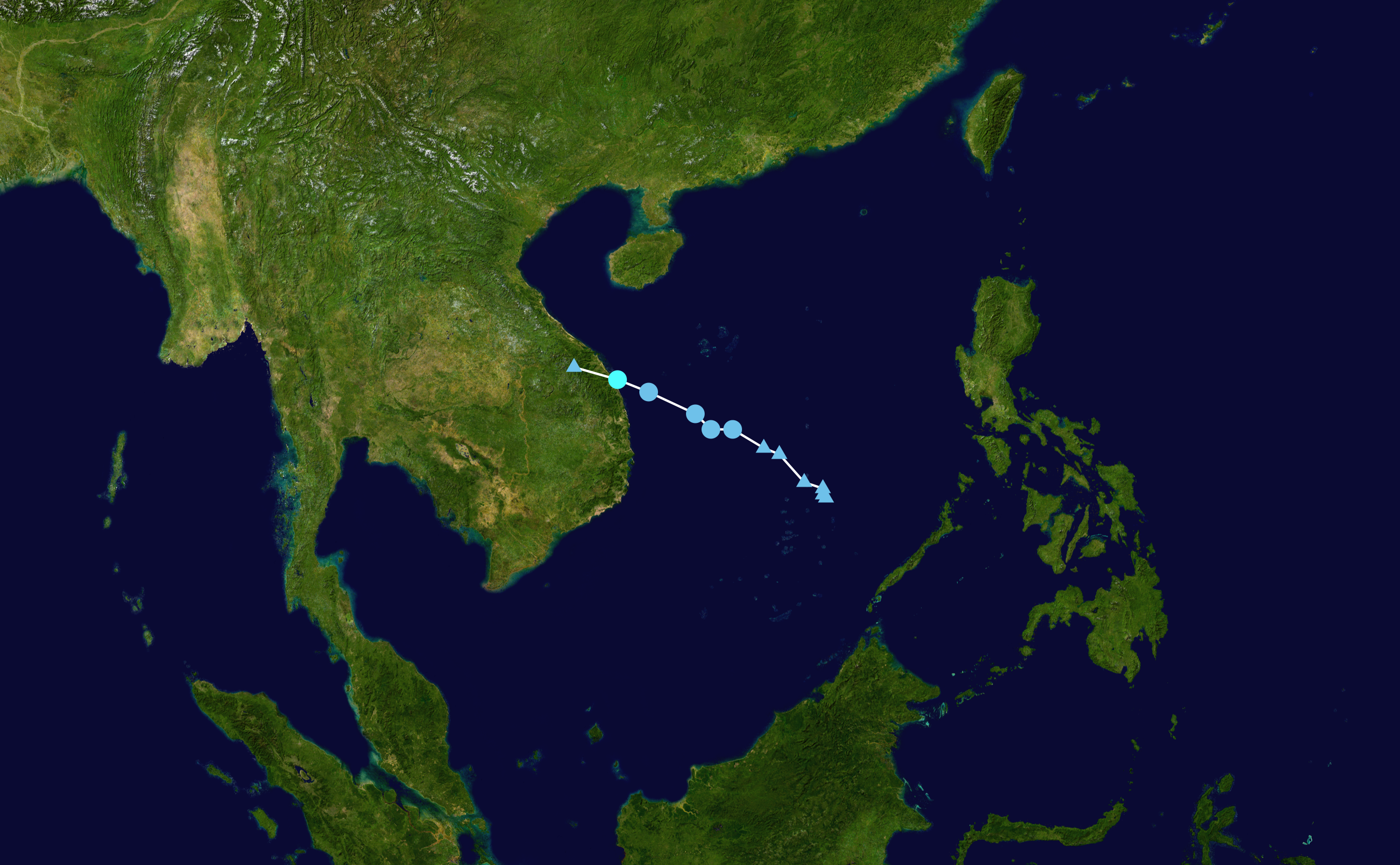
Map plotting the storm's track and intensity, according to the Saffir–Simpson scale Map key Saffir–Simpson scale Tropical depression (≤38 mph, ≤62 km/h) Tropical storm (39–73 mph, 63–118 km/h) Category 1 (74–95 mph, 119–153 km/h) Category 2 (96–110 mph, 154–177 km/h) Category 3 (111–129 mph, 178–208 km/h) Category 4 (130–156 mph, 209–251 km/h) Category 5 (≥157 mph, ≥252 km/h) Unknown Storm type Tropical cyclone Subtropical cyclone Extratropical cyclone, remnant low, tropical disturbance, or monsoon depression

Late on October 11, the JTWC began monitoring a scattered area of moderate convection within a broad low-level center 280 km (170 mi) west-southwest of Manila, Philippines. Within a marginally favorable environment of no distinct outflow established, low to moderate wind shear, and warm sea surface temperatures, the system slightly organized by the next day, with flaring convection and its center remaining exposed. Nonetheless, the JMA upgraded the system into a tropical depression on October 13. The JTWC later issued a TCFA on the system on the same day, noting fragmented deep convection was wrapping into its broad low-level center. By the next day, the JTWC initiated advisories on the storm, designating it as 22W. Moving westward, the storm intensified into a tropical storm six hours later, with the JMA naming it as Sonca. Sonca failed to intensify further as its center remained exposed, with deep convection displaced to the west due to strong wind shear, and it soon made landfall on Da Nang, Vietnam late on the same day, prompting the JTWC to issue their final advisory on the system. The JMA followed suit by October 15, as Sonca weakened into a tropical depression.

== Preparations and impact ==
As Sonca moved inland, it brought heavy rainfall to central Vietnam, with 700 mm (28 in) of rain fell in Da Nang during a 24-hour period on October 14–15; this resulted in major flooding throughout the region. The flooding killed a reported 10 people. Initial estimated economic losses in Da Nang City caused by Sonca's heavy precipitation are around 1.48 trillion VND (US$60.8 million). Infrastructure losses in Thừa Thiên Huế province reached 337 billion VND (US$13.5 million). 2 people were killed and 4 injured in the province. Overall, damages inflicted by Sonca were 2.4 trillion VND (US$101.5 million).
