= List of South Pacific tropical disturbances and tropical depressions =

Tropical disturbances and tropical depressions are the two lowest classifications on the South Pacific version of the Australian scale. Over the years, 178 South Pacific tropical cyclones have failed to organize into Category 1 tropical cyclones, the most recent being Tropical Disturbance 08F (2020).

== Background ==
The South Pacific tropical cyclone basin is located to the south of the Equator between 160°E and 120°W. The basin is officially monitored by the Fiji Meteorological Service and the New Zealand MetService, while other meteorological services such as the Australian Bureau of Meteorology, Météo-France as well as the United States Joint Typhoon Warning Center also monitor the basin. Within the region a tropical disturbance is classified as a non-frontal system that originates over the tropics and either has enhanced atmospheric convection or some indications of cyclonic wind circulation. A tropical disturbance is subsequently classified as a tropical depression or a tropical low, when there is a clearly defined circulation and the maximum 10-minute average wind speed is less than 34 knots (63 km/h; 39 mph; 17 m/s) near the centre.

== Systems ==
Name	System dates	Peak classification	Sustained wind speeds	Pressure	Land areas affected	Refs
Ada	January 2–5, 1970	Tropical depression	55 km/h (35 mph)	997 hPa (29.44 inHg)	Solomon Islands, Vanuatu	
Nora	October 29–30, 1970	Tropical depression	Not specified	Not specified	Fiji	
Unnamed	May 11, 1983	Tropical depression	Not specified	Not specified	None	
Unnamed	May 16, 1983	Tropical depression	Not specified	Not specified	None	
13P	February 2–5, 1987	Tropical depression	Not specified	Not specified		
04P	December 19–22, 1987	Tropical depression	65 km/h (40 mph)	997 hPa (29.44 inHg)	Tuvalu	
Unnamed	February 9–28, 1989	Tropical depression	Not specified	Not specified	Fiji	
Ernie	May 6–9, 1989	Tropical depression	65 km/h (40 mph)	997 hPa (29.44 inHg)		
Unnamed	May 28–30, 1989	Tropical depression	Not specified	Not specified	None	
Cook Islands	November 8–10, 1989	Tropical depression	Not specified	Not specified	Southern Cook Islands	
Samoa	December 14–17, 1989	Tropical depression	Not specified	Not specified	Samoan Islands	
Felicity	December 19–22, 1989	Tropical depression	75 km/h (45 mph)	990 hPa (29.23 inHg)	Norfolk Island	
Coral Sea	January 20–25, 1990	Tropical depression	65 km/h (40 mph)	Not specified	New Caledonia	
Samoa	February 6–9, 1990	Tropical depression	65 km/h (40 mph)	Not specified	Polynesia	
Joy	December 15–17, 1990	Tropical depression	55 km/h (35 mph)	998 hPa (29.47 inHg)	Solomon Islands	
16P	March 15–21	Tropical depression	65 km/h (40 mph)	1,000 hPa (29.53 inHg)	New Caledonia	
13P	January 16–18, 1992	Tropical storm	65 km/h (40 mph)	997 hPa (29.44 inHg)	Cook Islands	
08P	January 1–3, 1993	Tropical depression	Not specified	Not specified	Southern Cook Islands	
09P	January 11–13, 1993	Tropical depression	Not specified	Not specified	French Polynesia	
Unnamed	March 13–16	Tropical depression	Not specified	Not specified	None	
02F	December 16–20, 2003	Tropical disturbance	Not specified	1000 hPa (29.53 inHg)	Solomon Islands	
04F	December 29, 2003	Tropical disturbance	Not specified	1004 hPa (29.65 inHg)	Solomon Islands	
14F	April 18–19, 2004	Tropical Disturbance	Not specified	1006 hPa (29.71 inHg)	Tonga	
15F	April 22–24, 2004	Tropical Disturbance	Not specified	1006 hPa (29.71 inHg)	None	
01F	November 30 – December 2, 2005	Tropical depression	Not specified	1004 hPa (29.65 inHg)	None	
02F	December 3–6, 2005	Tropical depression	Not specified	1002 hPa (29.59 inHg)	None	
09F	January 30, 2006	Tropical depression	Not specified	994 hPa (29.35 inHg)	None	
02F	October 24 — 29	Tropical depression	Not specified	1004 hPa (29.65 inHg)	None	
03F	November 24 — 3	Tropical depression	Not specified	1004 hPa (29.65 inHg)	None	
05F	November 29 – December 4	Tropical depression	55 km/h (35 mph)	997 hPa (29.44 inHg)		
06F	January 9–17	Tropical depression	55 km/h (35 mph)	1,000 hPa (29.53 inHg)		
09F	February 1–5	Tropical depression	Not specified	997 hPa (29.44 inHg)	Fiji	
12F	March 21–25	Tropical depression	55 km/h (35 mph)	998 hPa (29.47 inHg)		
15F	Not specified	Tropical depression	Not specified	Not specified		
01F	October 17–19, 2007	Tropical depression	Not specified	1000 hPa (29.53 inHg)	Solomon Islands	
02F	November 20–22, 2007	Tropical depression	Not specified	1001 hPa (29.56 inHg)	Fiji	
03F	November 22 – December 2, 2007	Tropical depression	Not specified	999 hPa (29.50 inHg)		
05F	December 11–14, 2007	Tropical depression	45 km/h (30 mph)	1000 hPa (29.53 inHg)		
06F	December 26–28, 2007	Tropical disturbance	35 km/h (20 mph)	1006 hPa (29.71 inHg)		
08F	January 9–14, 2008	Tropical depression	45 km/h (30 mph)	998 hPa (29.47 inHg)		
09F	January 12–13, 2008	Tropical depression	Not specified	999 hPa (29.50 inHg)	Tonga	
11F	January 19–24, 2008	Tropical depression	75 km/h (45 mph)	999 hPa (29.50 inHg)		
13F	February 17–18, 2008	Tropical depression	45 km/h (30 mph)	1008 hPa (29.77 inHg)	None	
14F/24P	March 19–23, 2008	Tropical depression	55 km/h (35 mph)	998 hPa (29.47 inHg)	None	
15F	April 4–7, 2008	Tropical depression	45 km/h (30 mph)	1002 hPa (29.59 inHg)		
16F	April 16–19, 2008	Tropical depression	55 km/h (35 mph)	998 hPa (29.47 inHg)	New Caledonia	
01F	December 1–2, 2008	Tropical disturbance	Not specified	1006 hPa (29.71 inHg)	None	
02F	December 3–7, 2008	Tropical depression	Not specified	1004 hPa (29.65 inHg)	Southern Cook Islands	
03F	December 10, 2008	Tropical depression	Not specified	1001 hPa (29.56 inHg)	None	
04F	January 4–14, 2009	Tropical depression	Not specified	1001 hPa (29.56 inHg)	Fiji	
05F	January 11–14, 2009	Tropical depression	Not specified	999 hPa (29.50 inHg)	None	
06F	January 19–23, 2009	Tropical depression	Not specified	1005 hPa (29.68 inHg)	None	
07F	January 23–25, 2009	Tropical depression	Not specified	1006 hPa (29.71 inHg)	None	
09F	February 1–5, 2009	Tropical depression	55 km/h (35 mph)	998 hPa (29.47 inHg)	New Caledonia	
15F	April 7–10, 2009	Tropical disturbance	35 km/h (20 mph)	1004 hPa (29.65 inHg)	None	
02F	December 6–12, 2009	Tropical disturbance	Not specified	1003 hPa (29.62 inHg)	None	
03F	January 7–10, 2010	Depression	65 km/h (40 mph)	1002 hPa (29.59 inHg)	French Polynesia, Southern Cook Islands	
Olga	January 18–21, 2010	Tropical depression	Not specified	1002 hPa (29.59 inHg)	Solomon Islands	
05F	January 23–28, 2010	Tropical depression	Not specified	998 hPa (29.47 inHg)	None	
08F	February 2–4, 2010	Tropical depression	55 km/h (35 mph)	997 hPa (29.44 inHg)	French Polynesia, Southern Cook Islands	
15F	March 31 – April 3	Tropical Depression	Not specified	1003 hPa (29.62 inHg)	Fiji	
01F	November 24–30, 2010	Tropical depression	65 km/h (40 mph)	999 hPa (29.50 inHg)	Vanuatu, Fiji	
02F	December January 31–2	Tropical disturbance	Not specified	1004 hPa (29.65 inHg)	None	
04F	January 5–7, 2011	Tropical disturbance	Not specified	1002 hPa (29.59 inHg)	New Caledonia	
07F	January 20–22, 2011	Tropical depression	65 km/h (40 mph)	996 hPa (29.41 inHg)	New Caledonia	
Anthony	January 24–25, 2011	Tropical depression	45 km/h (30 mph)	998 hPa (29.47 inHg)	None	
12F	March 7–9, 2011	Tropical depression	45 km/h (30 mph)	1002 hPa (29.59 inHg)	Vanuatu	
14F	April 10–11, 2011	Tropical disturbance	Not specified	1005 hPa (29.68 inHg)	Vanuatu	
15F	April 15–17, 2011	Tropical depression	55 km/h (35 mph)	999 hPa (29.50 inHg)	None	
16F	April 28–30, 2011	Tropical depression	Not specified	1002 hPa (29.59 inHg)	None	
17F	May 10–11, 2011	Tropical depression	55 km/h (35 mph)	1000 hPa (29.53 inHg)	None	
01F	November 13–16, 2011	Tropical disturbance	Not specified	1004 hPa (29.65 inHg)	Fiji	
02F	December 28, 2011 – January 1, 2012	Tropical depression	Not specified	1002 hPa (29.59 inHg)	Niue, Cook Islands	
03F	January 7–8, 2012	Tropical disturbance	Not specified	1001 hPa (29.56 inHg)	Tonga	
04F	January 8–9, 2012	Tropical depression	Not specified	1000 hPa (29.53 inHg)	French Polynesia	
05F	January 8–10, 2012	Tropical disturbance	Not specified	1000 hPa (29.53 inHg)	Niue	
06F	January 20–24, 2012	Tropical depression	Not specified	1001 hPa (29.56 inHg)	Fiji	
07F	January 26 – February 2, 2012	Tropical depression	55 km/h (35 mph)	994 hPa (29.35 inHg)	Vanuatu, Fiji, New Caledonia	
08F	January 25–28, 2012	Tropical depression	Not specified	1001 hPa (29.56 inHg)	Fiji	
09F	January 30–31, 2012	Tropical depression	55 km/h (35 mph)	998 hPa (29.47 inHg)	Vanuatu, Fiji	
10F	February 2–6, 2012	Tropical depression	35 km/h (20 mph)	991 hPa (29.26 inHg)	Vanuatu, New Caledonia, Fiji, Tonga	
13F	February 13–17, 2012	Tropical depression	Not specified	1005 hPa (29.68 inHg)	New Caledonia, Vanuatu	
14F	March 16–18, 2012	Tropical depression	Not specified	1005 hPa (29.68 inHg)	New Zealand	
15F	March 19–20, 2012	Tropical disturbance	Not specified	1004 hPa (29.65 inHg)	New Caledonia	
16F	March 22–27, 2012	Tropical disturbance	Not specified	1003 hPa (29.62 inHg)	Wallis and Futuna, Fiji	
17F	March 25–30, 2012	Tropical depression	Not specified	1000 hPa (29.53 inHg)	Fiji	
18F	March 30–31, 2012	Tropical depression	Not specified	1004 hPa (29.65 inHg)	Vanuatu	
20F	April 9–11, 2012	Tropical depression	Not specified	1009 hPa (29.80 inHg)	New Caledonia	
01F	November 6–7, 2012	Tropical disturbance	Not specified	991 hPa (29.26 inHg)	Fiji	
02F	November 18–24, 2012	Tropical depression	45 km/h (30 mph)	1001 hPa (29.56 inHg)	Solomon Islands, Vanuatu, Fiji	
03F	December 9–17, 2012	Tropical depression	Not specified	997 hPa (29.44 inHg)	Cook Islands	
06F	December 30–31, 2012	Tropical depression	Not specified	1005 hPa (29.68 inHg)	None	
07F	January 7–9, 2013	Tropical disturbance	Not specified	1003 hPa (29.62 inHg)	French Polynesia	
08F	January 9–15, 2013	Tropical depression	45 km/h (30 mph)	999 hPa (29.50 inHg)	Wallis and Futuna, Fiji, Tonga	
10F	January 26–28, 2013	Tropical disturbance	Not specified	1000 hPa (29.53 inHg)	Solomon Islands	
11F	January 26–30, 2013	Tropical depression	55 km/h (35 mph)	995 hPa (29.38 inHg)	None	
12F	February 2, 2013	Tropical disturbance	Not specified	1000 hPa (29.53 inHg)	French Polynesia	
13F	February 3–7, 2013	Tropical disturbance	Not specified	997 hPa (29.44 inHg)	Cook Islands	
15F	February 21–24, 2013	Tropical depression	Not specified	1004 hPa (29.65 inHg)	Fiji	
16F	February 28 – March 7, 2013	Tropical disturbance	Not specified	998 hPa (29.47 inHg)	New Caledonia, Vanuatu, Fiji	
18F	March 12–15, 2013	Tropical disturbance	Not specified	1003 hPa (29.62 inHg)	Fiji	
19F	March 14–17, 2013	Tropical disturbance	Not specified	1006 hPa (29.71 inHg)	Vanuatu	
20F	March 27–30, 2013	Tropical disturbance	Not specified	1004 hPa (29.65 inHg)	None	
21F	April 20–27, 2013	Tropical disturbance	Not specified	1007 hPa (29.74 inHg)	None	
22F	April 28 – May 1, 2013	Tropical disturbance	Not specified	993 hPa (29.32 inHg)	None	
01F	October 19–20, 2013	Tropical disturbance	Not specified	1004 hPa (29.65 inHg)	Solomon Islands, Vanuatu	
02F	October 19–23, 2013	Tropical depression	Not specified	1002 hPa (29.59 inHg)	Kiribati, Vanuatu	
03F	October 21–22, 2013	Tropical depression	Not specified	1005 hPa (29.68 inHg)	Solomon Islands	
04F	October 25–27, 2013	Tropical depression	Not specified	1007 hPa (29.74 inHg)	Solomon Islands	
05F	December 9–13, 2013	Tropical depression	Not specified	999 hPa (29.50 inHg)	Fiji, Tonga	
06F	December 23–29, 2013	Tropical disturbance	Not specified	1003 hPa (29.62 inHg)	Vanuatu	
09F	January 21–24, 2014	Tropical depression	Not specified	1004 hPa (29.65 inHg)	Cook Islands, Niue, Tonga	
10F	January 22–24, 2014	Tropical disturbance	Not specified	1004 hPa (29.65 inHg)	Solomon Islands	
11F	January 29, 2014	Tropical disturbance	Not specified	1000 hPa (29.53 inHg)	Fiji	
13F	February 16–19, 2014	Tropical disturbance	Not specified	1003 hPa (29.62 inHg)	Vanuatu, Fiji	
14F	February 23–26, 2014	Tropical depression	Not specified	1002 hPa (29.59 inHg)	Vanuatu, Fiji	
Hadi	February 26–27; March 12–18, 2014	Tropical disturbance	Not specified	1000 hPa (29.53 inHg)	Solomon Islands, Vanuatu	
17F	March 6–8, 2014	Tropical disturbance	Not specified	1005 hPa (29.68 inHg)	Vanuatu	
21F	March 17–19, 2014	Tropical depression	45 km/h (30 mph)	998 hPa (29.47 inHg)	None	
01F	November 21–26, 2014	Tropical depression	Not specified	1003 hPa (29.62 inHg)	Tuvalu, Wallis and Futuna, Samoan Islands	
02F	December 16–17, 2014	Tropical disturbance	Not specified	1007 hPa (29.74 inHg)	None	
03F	December 20–26	Tropical depression	55 km/h (35 mph)	998 hPa (29.47 inHg)	Cook Islands	
04F	December 21–24	Tropical depression	Not specified	1000 hPa (29.53 inHg)	French Polynesia	
05F	December 23–29	Tropical depression	Not specified	1000 hPa (29.53 inHg)	Samoan Islands	
08F	January 27–30	Tropical disturbance	Not specified	1000 hPa (29.53 inHg)	Wallis and Futuna, Samoan Islands	
10F	February 2–4	Tropical disturbance	Not specified	1001 hPa (29.56 inHg)	Tuvalu	
13F	March 19–21	Tropical disturbance	Not specified	1004 hPa (29.65 inHg)	French Polynesia	
14F	March 28–31	Tropical depression	55 km/h (35 mph)	998 hPa (29.47 inHg)	Southern Cook Islands	
16F	April 15–16	Tropical depression	Not specified	1008 hPa (29.77 inHg)	None	
Raquel	June 28 – July 5, 2015	Tropical depression	55 km/h (35 mph)	1000 hPa (29.53 inHg)	Solomon Islands	
01F	July 29 – August 4	Tropical depression	Not specified	1000 hPa (29.53 inHg)	Solomon Islands, Vanuatu	
02F	October 12–18	Tropical depression	45 km/h (30 mph)	1001 hPa (29.56 inHg)	Vanuatu	
04F	December 1–2	Tropical disturbance	Not specified	1003 hPa (29.62 inHg)	French Polynesia	
06F	December 27–30, 2015	Tropical disturbance	Not specified	997 hPa (29.44 inHg)	Wallis and Futuna	
07F	December 28 – January 1, 2016	Tropical depression	Not specified	995 hPa (29.38 inHg)	Solomon Islands, Tuvalu, Fiji	
12F	February 29 – March 1, 2016	Tropical disturbance	Not specified	1000 hPa (29.53 inHg)	French Polynesia	
13F	March 19–22, 2016	Tropical disturbance	Not specified	998 hPa (29.47 inHg)	New Caledonia, Vanuatu	
14F	April 1–5, 2016	Tropical disturbance	Not specified	1002 hPa (29.59 inHg)	Vanuatu	
15F	April 2–6, 2016	Tropical disturbance	Not specified	998 hPa (29.47 inHg)	Fiji	
18F	April 20–27, 2016	Tropical disturbance	Not specified	1002 hPa (29.59 inHg)	French Polynesia	
01F	November 12–13, 2016	Tropical disturbance	Not specified	1008 hPa (29.77 inHg)	None	
02F	November 23–27, 2016	Tropical disturbance	Not specified	1006 hPa (29.71 inHg)	None	
03F	November 29–30, 2016	Tropical disturbance	Not specified	1000 hPa (29.53 inHg)	None	
04F	December 12–23, 2016	Tropical depression	45 km/h (30 mph)	998 hPa (29.47 inHg)	Fiji	
05F	December 21–26, 2016	Tropical depression	Not specified	1005 hPa (29.68 inHg)	None	
06F	January 2–6, 2017	Tropical disturbance	Not specified	1002 hPa (29.59 inHg)	None	
07F	January 10–20, 2017	Tropical disturbance	Not specified	998 hPa (29.47 inHg)	None	
08F	January 10–11, 2017	Tropical disturbance	Not specified	1009 hPa (29.80 inHg)	None	
09F	February 5–11, 2017	Tropical depression	Not specified	999 hPa (29.50 inHg)	Fiji	
10F	February 7–11, 2017	Tropical depression	Not specified	993 hPa (29.32 inHg)	Vanuatu, Fiji	
11F	February 9–12, 2017	Tropical depression	Not specified	1002 hPa (29.59 inHg)	Vanuatu, Fiji	
12F	February 15–24, 2017	Tropical disturbance	Not specified	1002 hPa (29.59 inHg)	Fiji	
13F	February 15–18, 2017	Tropical depression	Not specified	998 hPa (29.47 inHg)	None	
14F	February 16–22, 2017	Tropical depression	55 km/h (35 mph)	997 hPa (29.44 inHg)	Fiji	
16F	February 23–26, 2017	Tropical disturbance	Not specified	1005 hPa (29.68 inHg)	None	
17F	March 4–5, 2017	Tropical disturbance	Not specified	1006 hPa (29.71 inHg)	None	
18F	March 19–21, 2017	Tropical disturbance	Not specified	1007 hPa (29.74 inHg)	None	
19F	April 1–20, 2017	Tropical depression	Not specified	988 hPa (29.18 inHg)	Samoa, Niue	
02F	December 16–18, 2017	Tropical disturbance	Not specified	1003 hPa (29.62 inHg)	None	
03F	December 17–19, 2017	Tropical disturbance	Not specified	1000 hPa (29.53 inHg)	None	
04F	December 20–26, 2017	Tropical depression	Not specified	998 hPa (29.47 inHg)	Fiji	
05F	January 26–27, 2018	Tropical disturbance	Not specified	996 hPa (29.41 inHg)	New Caledonia	
08F	February 3–11, 2018	Tropical depression	Not specified	994 hPa (29.35 inHg)	Fiji	
10F	March 11–12, 2018	Tropical depression	Not specified	998 hPa (29.47 inHg)	None	
14F	April 17–20, 2018	Tropical depression	Not specified	1000 hPa (29.53 inHg)	Rotuma	
02F	November 11–16, 2018	Tropical disturbance	Not specified	1003 hPa (29.62 inHg)	Solomon Islands	
03F	December 28 – January 1, 2019	Tropical depression	55 km/h (35 mph)	998 hPa (29.47 inHg)	Solomon Islands, Fiji	
05F	December 31 – January 2, 2019	Tropical disturbance	Not specified	998 hPa (29.47 inHg)	None	
06F	February 3–9, 2019	Tropical depression	Not specified	994 hPa (29.35 inHg)	Wallis and Futuna, Fiji, Tonga	
08F	February 10–13, 2019	Tropical depression	Not specified	996 hPa (29.41 inHg)	Fiji, Tonga	
10F	February 11–13, 2019	Tropical depression	Not specified	996 hPa (29.41 inHg)	Wallis and Futuna, Fiji	
Ann	May 8–9, 2019	Tropical low	35 km/h (20 mph)	1004 hPa (29.65 inHg)	Solomon Islands, Queensland	
12F	May 16–21, 2019	Tropical depression	55 km/h (35 mph)	1002 hPa (29.59 inHg)	Rotuma	
02F	December 19–24, 2019	Tropical disturbance	Not specified	999 hPa (29.50 inHg)	None	
05F	January 24–26, 2020	Tropical disturbance	Not specified	1003 hPa (29.62 inHg)	Samoan Islands	

=== 2021-24 ===
Name	System dates	Peak classification	Sustained wind speeds	Pressure	Land areas affected	Refs
02F	December 18 - 21, 2021	Tropical disturbance	55 km/h (35 mph)		None	
04F	January 15 - 18, 2022	Tropical depression	55 km/h (35 mph)		Southern Cook Islands	
05F	January 15 - 18, 2022	Tropical depression	55 km/h (35 mph)		Southern Cook Islands	
06F	January 15 - 18, 2022	Tropical depression	55 km/h (35 mph)		None	
07F	February 3 - 7, 2022	Tropical depression	55 km/h (35 mph)		None	
01F	December 11 - 12, 2022	Tropical disturbance	45 km/h (30 mph)		None	
02F	December 22 - 31, 2022	Tropical disturbance	45 km/h (30 mph)		None	
03F	January 5 - 6, 2023	Tropical disturbance	45 km/h (30 mph)		None	
Hale	January 7 – 8, 2023	Tropical depression	55 km/h (35 mph)		New Caledonia, New Zealand	
06F	January 21 - 23, 2023	Tropical depression	45 km/h (30 mph)		None	
10F	March 10 - 11, 2023	Tropical depression	55 km/h (35 mph)		None	
11F	March 10 - 15, 2023	Tropical depression	55 km/h (35 mph)		None	
12F	March 11 - 15, 2023	Tropical disturbance	45 km/h (30 mph)		None	
13F	April 16 - 18, 2023	Tropical disturbance	45 km/h (30 mph)		None	
Jasper	December 2 - 18, 2023	Tropical disturbance	45 km/h (30 mph)	1002 hPa (29.59 inHg)	Solomon Islands, Queensland	

=== Other systems ===
Tropical Cyclone Raquel (2014) developed into a Category 1 tropical cyclone, as it moved out of the region and into the Australian Region.

== See also ==
- List of Category 1 Atlantic hurricanes
- List of Category 1 Pacific hurricanes
