= List of Pacific typhoons =

RSMC Tokyo's Tropical Cyclone Intensity Scale
| Category | Sustained winds |
|---|---|
| Violent typhoon | ≥105 knots ≥194 km/h |
| Very strong typhoon | 85–104 knots 157–193 km/h |
| Typhoon | 64–84 knots 118–156 km/h |
| Severe tropical storm | 48–63 knots 89–117 km/h |
| Tropical storm | 34–47 knots 62–88 km/h |
| Tropical depression | ≤33 knots ≤61 km/h |

The Northwest Pacific basin covers a vast area in the Pacific Ocean, located north of the equator, between 100°E and 180°E. Several weather agencies monitor this basin, however it is officially monitored by the Japan Meteorological Agency (JMA, RSMC Tokyo), who is responsible for forecasting, naming and issuing warnings for tropical cyclones. Unofficially, the Joint Typhoon Warning Center (JTWC) also monitors the basin, however these warnings measures 1-minute sustained wind speeds, comparing their scale to the Saffir–Simpson scale. The JMA uses a simpler scale on classifying tropical cyclones adapted by the ESCAP/WMO Typhoon Committee measuring 10-minute sustained wind speeds, ranging from a tropical depression, tropical storm, severe tropical storm and typhoon. Furthermore, the JMA divides the typhoon category into three sub-categories for domestic purposes – a strong typhoon, very strong typhoon and violent typhoon.

This article covers lists of all typhoons, including systems classified by JTWC and their predecessors as only typhoon before 1977, which refers to tropical cyclones with the strength between 65 and 129 knots.

== List of super typhoons ==
Since 1947, the Joint Typhoon Warning Center (JTWC) has classified all typhoons in the Northwestern Pacific Ocean with wind speeds of at least 130 knots (150 mph; 240 km/h)—the equivalent of a strong Category 4 on the Saffir-Simpson scale, as super typhoons. These typhoons are considered by JTWC to be separate from typhoon category, thus listed in the separate article.

== See also ==
- Pacific typhoon season
