= List of severe cyclonic storms =

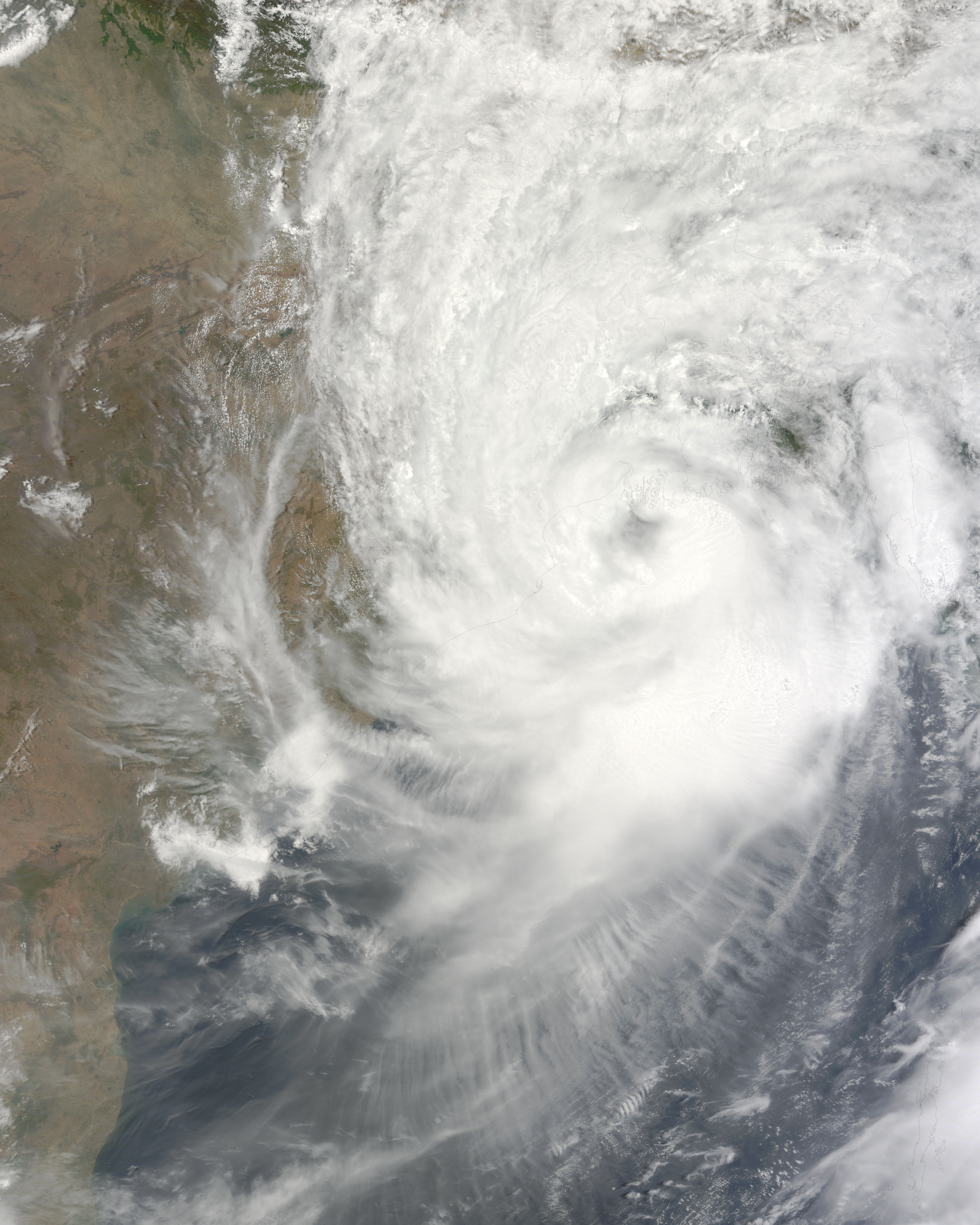
Cyclone Aila near peak intensity on May

A Severe Cyclonic Storm is a category used by the India Meteorological Department (IMD) to classify tropical cyclones, within the North Indian Ocean tropical cyclone basin between the Malay Peninsula and the Arabian Peninsula. Within the basin, a severe cyclonic storm is defined as a tropical cyclone that has 3-minute mean maximum sustained wind speeds of between 48–63 knots (89–117 km/h; 55–72 mph). The category was historically used to classify all tropical cyclones with winds above 48 knots (89 km/h; 55 mph), however, it was bifurcated during 1988, when the IMD introduced a new category called Severe Cyclonic Storm with a core of hurricane winds. This new category was later further refined into Very Severe Cyclonic Storms, Extremely Severe Cyclonic Storms and Super Cyclonic Storms during 1999 and 2015.

== Background ==
The North Indian Ocean tropical cyclone basin is located to the north of the Equator, and encompasses the Bay of Bengal and the Arabian Sea, between the Malay Peninsula and the Arabian Peninsula. The basin is officially monitored by the India Meteorological Department's Regional Specialized Meteorological Centre in New Delhi, however, other national meteorological services such as the Bangladesh and Pakistan Meteorological Department's also monitor the basin.

The Severe Cyclonic Storm category was historically used to classify all tropical cyclones with winds above 48 knots (89 km/h; 55 mph), however, it was bifurcated during 1988, when the IMD introduced a new category called Severe Cyclonic Storm with a core of hurricane winds for all systems above 64 knots (119 km/h; 74 mph). This new category was later further refined into Very Severe Cyclonic Storms, Extremely Severe Cyclonic Storms and Super Cyclonic Storms during 1999 and 2015. As a result, Severe Cyclonic Storms are currently estimated, to have 3-minute sustained wind speeds of between 48–64 kn (89–119 km/h; 55–74 mph).

== Systems ==
Name	Dates as a severe cyclonic storm	Duration	Sustained wind speeds	Pressure	Areas affected	Deaths	Damage (USD)	Refs
Unnamed	May 15 – 18, 1967	Not Specified	Not Specified	982 hPa (29.00 inHg)				
Unnamed	December 12 – 17, 1968	Not Specified	70 mph (110 km/h)	996 hPa (29.41 inHg)				
Unnamed	May 28 – June 2, 1970	Not Specified	60 mph (95 km/h)	986 hPa (29.12 inHg)	Saudi Arabia			
Unnamed	June 5, 1971	12 hours	Not Specified	976 hPa (28.82 inHg)	West Bengal			
Unnamed	October 31 – November 1, 1971	1 day	70 mph (110 km/h)	992 hPa (29.29 inHg)	Somalia			
Unnamed	November 5 – 6, 1971	1 day	70 mph (110 km/h)	992 hPa (29.29 inHg)				
Hatia	November 16 – 17, 1973	2 days	65 mph (100 km/h)	994 hPa (29.35 inHg)	Bangladesh			
Unnamed	December 7 – 9, 1973	2 days	70 mph (110 km/h)	992 hPa (29.29 inHg)				
Patuakhali	May 30 – June 1, 1974	1 day	60 mph (95 km/h)	986 hPa (29.12 inHg)				
Unnamed	September 24 – 24, 1974	1 day	70 mph (110 km/h)	990 hPa (29.23 inHg)				
Paradip	September 27 – 30, 1974	3 days	60 mph (95 km/h)	986 hPa (29.12 inHg)				
Chittagong	November 25 – 29, 1974	4 days	70 mph (110 km/h)	985 hPa (29.09 inHg)				
Unnamed	November 26 – 27, 1975	1 day	70 mph (110 km/h)	992 hPa (29.29 inHg)				
Unnamed	April 29 – May 3, 1976	Not Specified	70 mph (110 km/h)	986 hPa (29.12 inHg)				
Unnamed	October 12 – 18, 1976	Not Specified	60 mph (95 km/h)	998 hPa (29.47 inHg)				
Unnamed	November 15 – 17, 1976	Not Specified	70 mph (110 km/h)	992 hPa (29.29 inHg)				
Unnamed	May 11 - 12, 1977	1 day	70 mph (110 km/h)	984 hPa (29.06 inHg)				
Kavali	October 31 - November 1, 1977	1 day	65 mph (100 km/h)	996 hPa (29.41 inHg)				
Unnamed	June 19 - 20, 1979	1 day	65 mph (100 km/h)	980 hPa (28.94 inHg)				
Unnamed	June 19 - 20, 1979	1 day	65 mph (100 km/h)	980 hPa (28.94 inHg)				
Unnamed	August 7 - 8, 1979	1 day	65 mph (100 km/h)	971 hPa (28.67 inHg)				
Unnamed	September 25 - 26, 1981	1 day	65 mph (100 km/h)	983 hPa (29.03 inHg)	Orissa			
BOB 09	October 16, 1982	12 hours	65 mph (100 km/h)	Not Specified				
BOB 10	October 16, 1982	12 hours	65 mph (100 km/h)	982 hPa (29.00 inHg)				
Herbert	October 14 - 15, 1983	12 hours	65 mph (100 km/h)	Not Specified				
BOB 07	November 2 - 3, 1987	1 day 3 hours	65 mph (100 km/h)	984 hPa (29.06 inHg)				
BOB 08	November 12, 1987	12 hours	65 mph (100 km/h)	990 hPa (29.23 inHg)				
BOB 06	October 19, 1988	12 hours	65 mph (100 km/h)	Not Specified				
BOB 09	December 17, 1990	21 hours	65 mph (100 km/h)	Not Specified	Bangladesh, Myanmar			
BOB 07	November 13, 1992	18 hours	65 mph (100 km/h)	994 hPa (29.35 inHg)				
ARB 01	May 7, 1994	6 hours	65 mph (100 km/h)	980 hPa (28.94 inHg)				
BOB 03	October 30 - 31, 1994	18 hours	70 mph (110 km/h)	988 hPa (29.18 inHg)				
ARB 06	October 23 - 24, 1996	1 day 6 hours	70 mph (110 km/h)	994 hPa (29.35 inHg)				
BOB 01	May 19 - 20, 1998	21 hours	70 mph (110 km/h)	972 hPa (28.70 inHg)				
ARB 10	December 14 - 16, 1998	1 day 18 hours	65 mph (100 km/h)	993 hPa (29.32 inHg)				
BOB 01	February 3, 1999	6 hours	60 mph (95 km/h)	998 hPa (29.47 inHg)				
BOB 04	November 12, 2002	3 hours	65 mph (100 km/h)	990 hPa (29.23 inHg)				
ARB 06	November 13 - 14, 2003	1 day 6 hours	65 mph (100 km/h)	990 hPa (29.23 inHg)				
BOB 07	December 14 - 15, 2003	1 day 9 hours	65 mph (100 km/h)	990 hPa (29.23 inHg)				
ARB 01	May 7 - 8, 2004	1 day 9 hours	65 mph (100 km/h)	984 hPa (29.06 inHg)				
Onil	October 2, 2004	15 hours	65 mph (100 km/h)	984 hPa (29.06 inHg)				
Agni	November 30, 2004	12 hours	65 mph (100 km/h)	994 hPa (29.35 inHg)				
Mukda	September 23, 2006	9 hours	65 mph (100 km/h)	988 hPa (29.18 inHg)				
Aila	May 25, 2009	12 hours	70 mph (110 km/h)	968 hPa (28.59 inHg)	India, Bangladesh			
Laila	May 19 - 20, 2010	1 day 6 hours	65 mph (100 km/h)	986 hPa (29.12 inHg)	India			
Jal	November 1 – 8, 2010		70 mph (110 km/h)	988 hPa (29.18 inHg)	Thailand, Malaysia, Andaman Islands, India			
Helen	November 19 – 23, 2013	6 hours	65 mph (100 km/h)	990 hPa (29.23 inHg)	India			
Mora	May 29 – 30, 2017	21 hours	70 mph (110 km/h)	978 hPa (28.88 inHg)	Sri Lanka, Andaman and Nicobar Islands; India, Bangladesh, Myanmar, Bhutan, Tibet			
Phethai	December 16 – 17, 2018	6 hours	65 mph (100 km/h)	992 hPa (29.29 inHg)	India			
Nisarga	June 1– 4, 2020		70 mph (110 km/h)	990 hPa (29.23 inHg)	West India	6	>$664 million	
Shaheen	September 29 – October 4, 2021		70 mph (110 km/h)	986 hPa (29.12 inHg)	India, Pakistan, Iran, Oman, United Arab Emirates, Saudi Arabia	14	$100 million	
Asani	May 8 - 11, 2022		75 mph (120 km/h)	988 hPa (29.18 inHg)	India (Andhra Pradesh, Tamil Nadu, Karnataka, Odisha, Andaman and Nicobar Islands)	3	Unknown	
Mandous								
Michaung	December 2–5, 2023		80 mph (130 km/h)	988 hPa (29.18 inHg)	India (Andhra Pradesh, Tamil Nadu, Odisha, Puducherry)	17		
Remal	May 24-28, 2024		110 km/h (68 mph)	978 mbar (28.9 inHg)	India (Odisha, West Bengal), Bangladesh	84	$600 Million	
Dana	October 24,2024 -Present		120 km/h (75 mph)	984 hPa (29.1 inHg)	India (Odisha, West Bengal), Bangladesh	6	Unknown	

== Climatology ==
Severe Cyclonic Storms by month.
Month	Number of storms
January	0
February	1
March	0
April	1
May	10
June	3
July	0
August	2
September	5
October	11
November	17
December	3

Severe Cyclonic Storms by decade.
Period	Number of storms
1950s	0
1960s	0
1970s	18
1980s	7
1990s	8
2000s	9
2010s	4
2020s	0
