= Cyclone Michaung =

North Indian Ocean Cyclone in 2023

Severe Cyclonic Storm Michaung
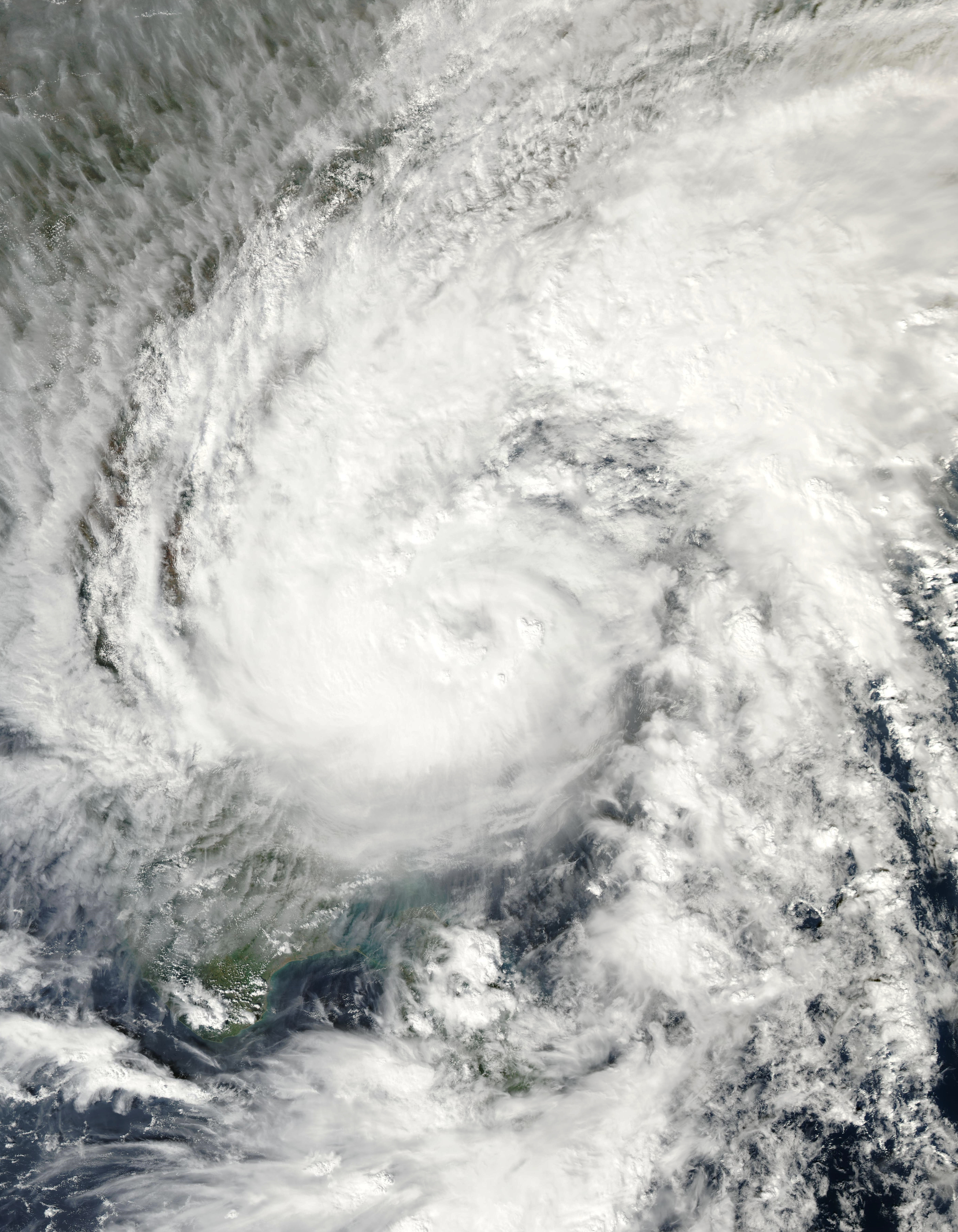
- Cyclone Michaung near peak intensity on 4 December

Meteorological history
- Formed: 1 December 2023
- Dissipated: 6 December 2023

Severe cyclonic storm
- 3-minute sustained (IMD)
- Highest winds: 100 km/h (65 mph)
- Lowest pressure: 986 hPa (mbar); 29.12 inHg

Category 1-equivalent tropical cyclone
- 1-minute sustained (SSHWS/JTWC)
- Highest winds: 120 km/h (75 mph)
- Lowest pressure: 985 hPa (mbar); 29.09 inHg

Overall effects
- Fatalities: 17
- Damage: $1.32 billion (2023 USD)
- Areas affected: India (particularly in Tamil Nadu and Andhra Pradesh), Bangladesh
- Part of the 2023 North Indian Ocean cyclone season

Severe Cyclonic Storm Michaung (Note: The name Michaung (Burmese: မိကျောင်း, [mḭ.d͡ʑáʊɴ]) was contributed by Myanmar and means "crocodile" in Burmese.) was a moderate tropical cyclone which formed in the Bay of Bengal during the 2023 North Indian Ocean cyclone season. Michaung originated as a low-pressure area in the Gulf of Thailand which crossed into the Bay of Bengal and became a deep depression on December 2. It developed into a cyclonic storm thereafter and was named Michaung. It was the ninth depression and the sixth named cyclonic storm of the season. The cyclone gradually moved north-west over the next few days towards the eastern coast of India. The storm peaked with sustained winds of 60 knots (110 km/h; 70 mph) causing heavy rainfall in north-eastern Tamil Nadu including Chennai and south-eastern Andhra Pradesh before making landfall near Bapatla in Andhra Pradesh on December 5.

== Meteorological history ==
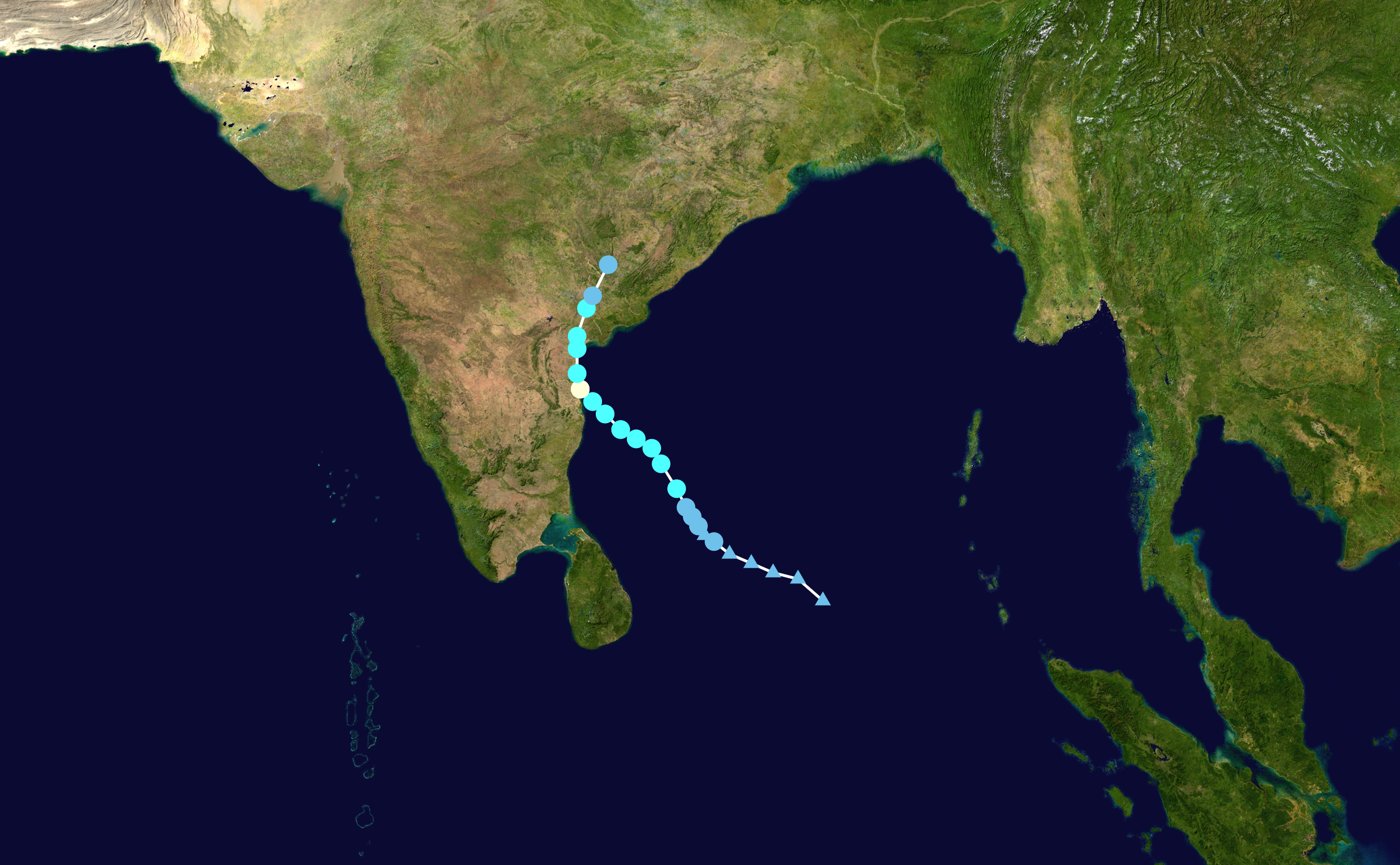
Map plotting the storm's track and intensity, according to the Saffir–Simpson scale Map key Saffir–Simpson scale Tropical depression (≤38 mph, ≤62 km/h) Tropical storm (39–73 mph, 63–118 km/h) Category 1 (74–95 mph, 119–153 km/h) Category 2 (96–110 mph, 154–177 km/h) Category 3 (111–129 mph, 178–208 km/h) Category 4 (130–156 mph, 209–251 km/h) Category 5 (≥157 mph, ≥252 km/h) Unknown Storm type Tropical cyclone Subtropical cyclone Extratropical cyclone, remnant low, tropical disturbance, or monsoon depression

In late November 2023, a low-pressure area crossed into the Bay of Bengal from the Gulf of Thailand. On December 1, the India Meteorological Department (IMD) said the disturbance had developed into a depression in the South Andaman Sea, and was expected to move towards the northwest while strengthening in the Bay of Bengal. On December 2, the system intensified into a deep depression located about 440 kilometres (270 mi) east-southeast of Puducherry. Thereafter, it intensified into a cyclonic storm, and was assigned the name Michaung by Myanmar.

On December 4, cyclone Michaung reached peak intensity as it approached the coast of Tamil Nadu with winds of 110 kilometres per hour (68 mph), equivalent to a high-end tropical storm on the Saffir–Simpson scale. Michaung moved almost directly northward along the coast. On December 5, the storm made landfall between Nellore and Machilipatnam in Andhra Pradesh, weakening as it moved inland. By December 6, the storm had weakened to a depression over central Andhra Pradesh.

=== Meteorological data ===
According to the IMD reports, INSAT-3D satellite imagery on December 5 indicated a cloud mass with broken low to medium clouds and intense convection extending over west-central Bay of Bengal and the coastal region of Andhra Pradesh, spanning from latitude 13.5°N to 17.5°N and longitude 80.0E to 82.5E. The minimum cloud top temperature was recorded at −90 °C (−130 °F). Coastal surface observations from various locations on the coast indicated a maximum wind speed of 60 knots (110 km/h; 69 mph) and a minimum sea level pressure of 988 hectopascals (29.2 inHg). Nungambakkam in Chennai recorded the maximum rainfall of 530 mm (21 in) in the three-day period between December 2 and 4.

== Preparations and impact ==
As the storm approached the east coast of India, India's meteorological department issued a red alert for the region. In Tamil Nadu, over 500 personnel of National Disaster Response Force (NDRF) and Tamil Nadu Disaster Response Force (TNDRF) were deployed. 121 multi-purpose centres and 4,967 relief centres were set-up in the eight coastal districts of Tamil Nadu to help in the aftermath of the cyclone. In Andhra Pradesh, 181 relief camps were set up across the eight districts, with the National Disaster Response Force (NDRF) and AP State Disaster Response Force (APSDRF) deploying five teams each to assist in the affected areas. Southern districts of Odisha were also to receive heavy rainfall due to the cyclone, and the Odisha Disaster Rapid Action Force were deployed to assist local authorities.

Heavy rain and strong winds battered the coastal areas. Persistent rains caused widespread flooding and inundation in Chennai, the capital of Tamil Nadu. Rivers including Cooum and major lakes overflowed in Chennai causing further water logging in the low-lying areas along the banks. At least 17 people were killed, and more than 41,000 people were evacuated and temporarily relocated, including 32,158 in Tamil Nadu and 9,500 in Andhra Pradesh. Power supply was cut off by the government in flooded areas in Chennai as a preventive measure to avert electrocution. Economic loss in Tamil Nadu exceeded ₹11,000 crore (US$1.32 billion).

Chennai International Airport closed its operations on December 4 due to flooding in the apron and runways, with flights being diverted or cancelled and operations resuming the next day. Schools and offices were closed due to heavy rains and flooding. Southern Railways and East Coast Railways re-directed and cancelled several trains. Several businesses and industries in Chennai were impacted adversely as operations were ceased due to power shortages, flooding and damage to equipment. In Andhra Pradesh, crop damage and losses were reported due to the flooding of fields. There was also a shortage of essential commodities including milk which was exacerbated by panic buying.

== Relief efforts ==
The Indian Air Force air dropped more than 2,300 kilograms (5,100 lb) of food packets and relief supplies in affected areas of Chennai, while the Indian Navy, in collaboration with the Indian Army and National Disaster Response Force (NDRF), was tasked with rescuing people and providing supplies using inflatable boats. Greater Chennai Corporation pressed more workers for flood recovery and aiding stranded people while citing staff crunch for delays in clearing fallen trees and garbage. Volunteers engaged in distributing food packets, milk, water bottles and rescuing stranded people through boats in the inundated areas.

Relief materials were sent from various districts of Tamil Nadu to the affected areas. Various NGOs, religious and volunteer groups helped in the relief effort. On December 9, Chief Minister of Tamil Nadu M. K. Stalin announced a relief of ₹5 lakh (US$6,000) for families of those who lost their lives, ₹37,500 (US$450) for individuals who lost cattle, ₹17,000 (US$200) per hectare for paddy cultivators who lost the crop and ₹8,000 (US$96) for who lost their homes. A relief package worth ₹6,000 (US$72) was announced to be distributed through Public Distribution System (PDS) outlets for those who were impacted by the cyclone. but this relief package was provided only to families which don't pay any income tax to Government of India. Many political parties including AIADMK, DMK and BJP ran relief campaigns and distribution programmes.

Stalin donated one month salary to the state disaster relief fund and appealed to others to donate. TVS Motors and Ashok Leyland contributed ₹3 crore (US$360,000) each to flood relief. Actors Suriya and Karthi donated ₹10 lakh (US$12,000) each to the relief fund.

As many personal and transport vehicles were damaged during the floods, auto companies announced various aid measures. Maruti Suzuki helped mobilize tow trucks, provide road side assistance; Hyundai announced a relief package of ₹3 crore (US$360,000) for flood relief; Tata Motors announced an extension of the warranty, maintenance contracts and provided emergency road assistance; Mahindra announced complimentary roadside assistance, no-cost inspection and financial discounts; Toyota set-up special emergency helpline and designated personnel for immediate assistance.

== Response ==
=== National ===
On December 4, Home minister Amit Shah spoke to chief ministers of Tamil Nadu and Andhra Pradesh assuring of all the help required and stating that the NDRF and Armed forces will be pressed into action. Member of Parliament Kanimozhi stated on December 5 that the government of Tamil Nadu have taken proactive measures to address the impact of the cyclone with the establishment of over 400 shelters for the affected population, pumping of stagnant water and restoration of electricity. On December 6, Prime Minister Narendra Modi expressed condolences to the families of those who lost their loved ones and prayed for those injured or affected. He also stated that the authorities have been working tirelessly to assist those affected and will continue to work towards normalization. Opposition MPs appealed to the Central government to extend its full assistance to Tamil Nadu in managing the repercussions of the cyclone. They demanded that the disaster be declared as a national calamity.

On December 6, chief minister of Tamil Nadu M.K.Stalin wrote to the Prime Minister seeking ₹5,060 crore (US$608 million) for interim flood relief from the disaster response fund. Defence minister Rajnath Singh conducted an aerial survey of the affected areas in Tamil Nadu on December 7 and met with chief minister Stalin. On December 7, Central government released a second installment of ₹450 crore (US$54 million) to the Tamil Nadu disaster relief fund and ₹493.5 crore (US$59.3 million) to the Andhra Pradesh disaster relief fund having already released the same amount earlier. Amit Shah announced that the Prime Minister has already approved the first urban flood mitigation project of ₹561.29 crore (US$67.4 million) for urban flood management activities for Chennai under the National Disaster Mitigation Fund (NDMF) with a central assistance of ₹500 crore (US$60 million).

On December 8, representatives of various micro, small and medium enterprises sought time to repay loans and electricity charges due to flood related losses and damages. On December 9, Union minister of state Rajeev Chandrasekhar visited Chennai to assess the damages and coordinate with the state government for further assistance

=== International ===
Australian cricketer David Warner shared his concern for those affected by the floods and advised safety.

== See also ==
- Weather of 2023
- Tropical cyclones in 2023
- 2015 South Indian floods
