= 2000 Hyderabad floods =

Natural disaster in Hyderabad, India

- Date: 24 August 2000
- Location: Hyderabad (Andhra Pradesh, India)
- Type: Urban flooding

The 2000 Hyderabad floods caused extensive damage and loss of life as a result of flash flooding in Hyderabad, Andhra Pradesh, India. Begumpet was the most impacted after a deluge of 241.5 mm was recorded on 24 August 2000.

== Aftermath ==
In cooperation with Geological Survey of India (GSI) the then Andhra Pradesh state government formed Kirloskar committee. According to the committee findings; a 390 km of drain area was illegally occupied by 13,500 structures due to which urban flooding occurs.

== See also ==
- 2020 Hyderabad floods
- Great Musi Flood of 1908
