= List of depressions and deep depressions in the North Indian Ocean =

Depressions in the North Indian Ocean

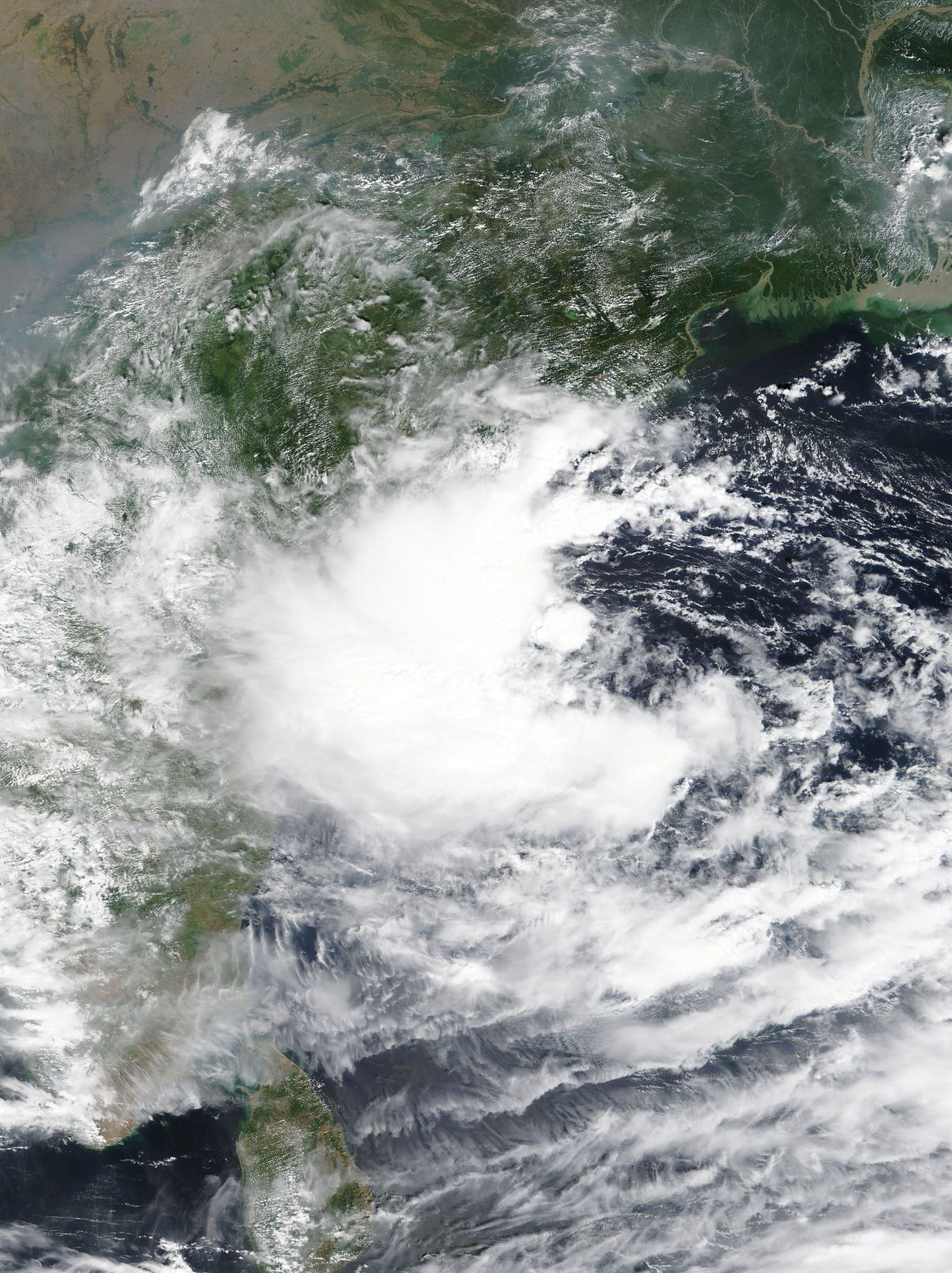
BOB 02, at its peak intensity

A Depression and Deep Depressions are categories used by the India Meteorological Department (IMD) to classify tropical cyclones, within the North Indian Ocean tropical cyclone basin between the Malay Peninsula and the Arabian Peninsula.

== Background ==
The North Indian Ocean tropical cyclone basin is located to the north of the Equator, and encompasses the Bay of Bengal and the Arabian Sea, between the Malay Peninsula and the Arabian Peninsula. The basin is officially monitored by the India Meteorological Department's Regional Specialized Meteorological Centre in New Delhi, however, other national meteorological services such as the Bangladesh and Pakistan Meteorological Department's also monitor the basin.

== Systems ==
Name	Duration	Peak intensity		Areas affected	Damage (USD)	Deaths	Refs
Name	Duration	Wind speed	Pressure	Areas affected	Damage (USD)	Deaths	Refs
Unnamed	May 19 - 27, 1891	Depression	Not Specified	Not Specified	Sri Lanka, Tamil Nadu, Andrah Pradesh, Orissa		
Unnamed	June 29, 1967	Depression	Not Specified	Not Specified			
Unnamed	July 26 – 29, 1967	Deep Depression	Not Specified	Not Specified			
Unnamed	July 31 – August 2, 1967	Deep Depression	Not Specified	Not Specified			
Unnamed	August 18 – 19, 1967	Depression	Not Specified	Not Specified			
Unnamed	September 2 – 7, 1967	Deep Depression	Not Specified	Not Specified			
Land	September 20, 1967	Depression	Not Specified	Not Specified			
Unnamed	September 27 – 29, 1967	Deep Depression	Not Specified	Not Specified			
Unnamed	October 31 – November 2, 1967	Depression	Not Specified	Not Specified			
Unnamed	November 27 – 29, 1967	Depression	Not Specified	Not Specified			
Unnamed	June 12 – 14, 1968	Depression	Not Specified	Not Specified			
Land	July 9 – 11, 1968	Depression	Not Specified	Not Specified	West Bengal	100	
Unnamed	July 26 – August 2, 1968	Deep Depression	Not Specified	Not Specified			
Unnamed	August 3 – 8, 1968	Deep Depression	Not Specified	Not Specified			
Unnamed	August 11 – 14, 1968	Depression	Not Specified	Not Specified	West Bengal		
Unnamed	August 22 – 24, 1968	Depression	Not Specified	Not Specified			
Unnamed	June 5 – 7, 1969	Depression	Not Specified	Not Specified	Gujarat		
Unnamed	June 16 – 20, 1969	Depression	Not Specified	Not Specified	Bangladesh		
Unnamed	July 28 – August 1, 1969	Deep Depression	Not Specified	Not Specified	Orissa		
Unnamed	August 8, 1969	Depression	Not Specified	Not Specified	Sunderbans		
Unnamed	September 6 – 11, 1969	Depression	Not Specified	Not Specified	Orissa		
Unnamed	September 18 – 23, 1969	Deep Depression	Not Specified	Not Specified	Indochina, Bangladesh, West Bengal		
Unnamed	September 23 – 26, 1969	Depression	Not Specified	Not Specified	Sri Lanka, Tamil Nadu		
Unnamed	May 23 – 24, 1970	Depression	Not Specified	Not Specified	Bangladesh, Myanmar		
Unnamed	June 29 – July 3, 1970	Deep Depression	Not Specified	Not Specified	Orissa		
Unnamed	July 6 – 8, 1970	Deep Depression	Not Specified	Not Specified	Burma, Orissa		
Unnamed	August 17 – 19, 1970	Deep Depression	Not Specified	Not Specified	Burma, Orissa		
Unnamed	September 8 – 18, 1970	Deep Depression	Not Specified	Not Specified	Burma, West Bengsl		
Unnamed	September 21 – 23, 1970	Depression	Not Specified	Not Specified	Andrah Pradesh		
Unnamed	October 11 – 13, 1970	Depression	Not Specified	Not Specified	Saudi Arabia		
Unnamed	November 19 – 20, 1970	Deep Depression	Not Specified	Not Specified	Tamil Nadu		
Unnamed	June 1 – 4, 1971	Deep Depression	Not Specified	Not Specified	Gugarat		
Unnamed	June 20 – 23, 1971	Deep Depression	Not Specified	Not Specified	Orissa		
Unnamed	July 15 – 22, 1971	Depression	Not Specified	Not Specified	West Bengal		
Land	July 26 – 29, 1971	Depression	Not Specified	Not Specified	West Bengal		
Unnamed	August 7 – 9, 1971	Deep Depression	Not Specified	Not Specified	West Bengal		
Land	August 30 – September 1, 1971	Depression	Not Specified	Not Specified	Madhya Pradesh		
Unnamed	September 24 – 25, 1971	Depression	Not Specified	Not Specified	Andrah Pradesh		
Unnamed	October 14 – 17, 1971	Deep Depression	Not Specified	Not Specified	Andrah Pradesh		
Unnamed	June 25 – 27, 1972	Depression	Not Specified	Not Specified	Oman		
Unnamed	July 1 – 2, 1972	Depression	Not Specified	Not Specified	Oman		
Unnamed	July 5 – 6, 1972	Depression	Not Specified	Not Specified	Madhya Pradesh		
Land	August 5 – 12, 1972	Deep Depression	Not Specified	Not Specified	West Bengal, Bangladesh		
Unnamed	August 12 – 20, 1972	Deep Depression	Not Specified	Not Specified	Madhya Pradesh		
Land	August 28 – 31, 1972	Depression	Not Specified	Not Specified	Madhya Pradesh		
Unnamed	October 2 – 5, 1972	Deep Depression	Not Specified	Not Specified	Andrah Pradesh, Orissa		
Unnamed	November 13 – 21, 1972	Deep Depression	Not Specified	Not Specified	Somalia		
Unnamed	November 27 – 29, 1972	Deep Depression	Not Specified	Not Specified	Myanmae		
Sally	December 5 – 6, 1972	Depression	Not Specified	Not Specified	Philippines, Vietnam, Thailand, Myanmar, Andaman and Nicobar Islands		
Unnamed	December 20, 1972	Depression	Not Specified	Not Specified	Sri Lanka, Tamil Nadu		
Unnamed	July 6 – 9, 1973	Deep Depression	Not Specified	Not Specified	Orissa		
Unnamed	July 12 – 14, 1973	Deep Depression	Not Specified	Not Specified	Orissa		
Unnamed	May 26 – 28, 1973	Deep Depression	Not Specified	Not Specified	Gulf of Aden		
Unnamed	July 7 – 8, 1973	Depression	Not Specified	Not Specified	Gujarat		
Unnamed	August 14 – 18, 1973	Deep Depression	Not Specified	Not Specified	Uttar Pradesh		
Unnamed	August 26 – 31, 1973	Deep Depression	Not Specified	Not Specified	Orissa		
Unnamed	September 2 – 5, 1973	Depression	Not Specified	Not Specified	West Bengal		
Unnamed	October 24 – 27, 1973	Depression	Not Specified	Not Specified			
Unnamed	December 13 – 15, 1973	Deep Depression	Not Specified	Not Specified	Tamil Nadu		
Unnamed	December 25 – 27, 1973	Depression	Not Specified	Not Specified	Sri Lanka		
Unnamed	June 15 – 18, 1974	Deep Depression	Not Specified	Not Specified	Orissa		
Unnamed	August 8 – 9, 1974	Depression	Not Specified	Not Specified	Orissa		
Unnamed	October 7 – 8, 1974	Deep Depression	Not Specified	Not Specified	Orissa		
Unnamed	October 14 – 15, 1974	Depression	Not Specified	Not Specified			
Unnamed	October 24 – 25, 1974	Depression	Not Specified	Not Specified	Andrah Pradesh		
Unnamed	January 6 – 10, 1975	Deep Depression	Not Specified	Not Specified	Burma		
Unnamed	May 29 – 31, 1975	Depression	Not Specified	Not Specified			
Unnamed	June 18 – 19, 1975	Depression	Not Specified	Not Specified	Orissa		
Unnamed	June 25 – 28, 1975	Deep Depression	Not Specified	Not Specified	Orissa		
Unnamed	July 18 – 22, 1975	Deep Depression	Not Specified	Not Specified	West Bengal		
Unnamed	August 5 – 7, 1975	Depression	Not Specified	Not Specified	Orissa		
Unnamed	August 17 – 24, 1975	Deep Depression	Not Specified	Not Specified	West Bengal		
Unnamed	September 9 – 12, 1975	Depression	Not Specified	Not Specified	Orissa		
Unnamed	September 25 – 27, 1975	Deep Depression	Not Specified	Not Specified	West Bengal		
Unnamed	October 2 – 5, 1975	Depression	Not Specified	Not Specified			
Unnamed	July 28 – August 1, 1976	Deep Depression	Not Specified	Not Specified	Bangladesh, West Bengal		
Unnamed	August 1 – 3, 1976	Deep Depression	Not Specified	Not Specified	Orissa		
Unnamed	August 12 – 18, 1976	Deep Depression	Not Specified	Not Specified	Orissa		
Unnamed	November 13 – 16, 1976	Deep Depression	Not Specified	Not Specified			
Unnamed	July 4 – 6, 1977	Deep Depression	Not Specified	Not Specified	West Bengal		
Unnamed	July 24 – 25, 1977	Depression	Not Specified	Not Specified			
Land	July 30 – 31, 1977	Depression	Not Specified	Not Specified			
Unnamed	August 4 – 9, 1977	Deep Depression	Not Specified	Not Specified			
Unnamed	August 19 – 23, 1977	Deep Depression	Not Specified	Not Specified			
Unnamed	August 30 – September 2, 1977	Depression	Not Specified	Not Specified			
Unnamed	September 4 – 6, 1977	Deep Depression	Not Specified	Not Specified			
Unnamed	September 8 – 15, 1977	Deep Depression	Not Specified	Not Specified			
Unnamed	September 30 – October 2, 1977	Deep Depression	Not Specified	Not Specified			
Unnamed	October 18 – 22, 1977	Deep Depression	Not Specified	Not Specified			
Unnamed	November 2 – 4, 1977	Depression	Not Specified	Not Specified			
Unnamed	November 9 – 14, 1977	Depression	Not Specified	Not Specified			
Unnamed	June 16 – 17, 1978	Deep Depression	Not Specified	Not Specified			
Unnamed	June 26 – 27, 1978	Depression	Not Specified	Not Specified			
Unnamed	July 11 – 13, 1978	Depression	Not Specified	Not Specified			
Unnamed	July 11 – 14, 1978	Deep Depression	Not Specified	Not Specified			
Unnamed	August 13 – 17, 1978	Deep Depression	Not Specified	Not Specified			
Unnamed	September 1 – 5, 1978	Deep Depression	Not Specified	Not Specified			
Unnamed	September 15 – 16, 1978	Depression	Not Specified	Not Specified			
Unnamed	September 21, 1978	Depression	Not Specified	Not Specified			
Unnamed	September 26 – 30, 1978	Deep Depression	Not Specified	Not Specified			
Unnamed	October 2 – 6, 1978	Deep Depression	Not Specified	Not Specified			
Unnamed	June 23 – 26, 1979	Deep Depression	Not Specified	Not Specified			
Unnamed	June 28 – July 1, 1979	Deep Depression	Not Specified	Not Specified			
Unnamed	July 7 – 8, 1979	Depression	Not Specified	Not Specified			
Unnamed	August 12 – 15, 1979	Depression	Not Specified	Not Specified			
Unnamed	October 29 – November 1, 1979	Deep Depression	Not Specified	Not Specified			
Unnamed	November 13 – 17, 1979	Deep Depression	Not Specified	Not Specified			
Unnamed	May 15 – 19, 1980	Depression	Not Specified	Not Specified			
Unnamed	June 4 – 6, 1980	Depression	Not Specified	Not Specified			
Land	June 20 – 25, 1980	Depression	Not Specified	Not Specified			
Land	August 10 – 11, 1980	Depression	Not Specified	Not Specified			
Land	August 25 – 30, 1980	Depression	Not Specified	Not Specified			
Unnamed	August 26, 1980	Depression	Not Specified	Not Specified			
Land	September 5 – 6, 1980	Depression	Not Specified	Not Specified			
Unnamed	September 16 – 21, 1980	Deep Depression	Not Specified	Not Specified			
Unnamed	October 1 – 4, 1980	Depression	Not Specified	Not Specified			
Unnamed	October 14 – 19, 1980	Deep Depression	Not Specified	Not Specified			
Unnamed	November 13 – 20, 1980	Deep Depression	Not Specified	Not Specified			
Unnamed	June 20 – 24, 1981	Deep Depression	Not Specified	Not Specified			
Unnamed	August 3 – 4, 1981	Depression	Not Specified	Not Specified			
Unnamed	August 12 – 16, 1981	Depression	Not Specified	Not Specified			
Land	September 9, 1981	Depression	Not Specified	Not Specified			
Unnamed	September 17 – 18, 1981	Depression	Not Specified	Not Specified			
Unnamed	October 31 – November 2, 1981	Depression	Not Specified	Not Specified			
Land	June 17 – 19, 1982	Depression	45 km/h (30 mph)	Not Specified			
ARB 13	July 15 – 16, 1982	Depression	45 km/h (30 mph)	Not Specified			
BOB 03	July 18 – 20, 1982	Deep Depression	55 km/h (35 mph)	Not Specified			
BOB 04	August 12 – 13, 1982	Depression	45 km/h (30 mph)	Not Specified			
Land	August 2 – 4, 1982	Depression	45 km/h (30 mph)	Not Specified			
BOB 05	August 18 – 19, 1982	Depression	45 km/h (30 mph)	Not Specified	West Bengal, Bangladesh		
Land	August 25, 1982	Depression	45 km/h (30 mph)	Not Specified	Uttar Pradesh		
BOB 06	August 27 – September 2, 1982	Depression	45 km/h (30 mph)	Not Specified			
BOB 07	September 9 – 10, 1982	Depression	45 km/h (30 mph)	Not Specified			
BOB 08	September 29, 1982	Depression	45 km/h (30 mph)	Not Specified			
ARB 14	October 1 – 2, 1982	Deep Depression	55 km/h (35 mph)	Not Specified			
BOB 11	November 28 – 29, 1982	Deep Depression	55 km/h (35 mph)	Not Specified			
Unnamed	November 29 – 30, 1982	Depression	45 km/h (30 mph)	Not Specified			
BOB 12	December 2 – 4, 1982	Depression	45 km/h (30 mph)	Not Specified			
ARB 01	June 19 – 22, 1983	Deep Depression	55 km/h (35 mph)	Not Specified	Gujarat		
BOB 02	June 23 – 27, 1983	Deep Depression	55 km/h (35 mph)	Not Specified			
Land	August 4 – 10, 1983	Deep Depression	55 km/h (35 mph)	Not Specified			
Land	September 8 – 10, 1983	Depression	45 km/h (30 mph)	Not Specified			
Land	December 21 – 23, 1983	Depression	45 km/h (30 mph)	Not Specified	Sri Lanka		
ARB 01	June 5 – 6, 1984	Depression	45 km/h (30 mph)	Not Specified	Gujarat		
BOB 02	July 30 – August 6, 1984	Deep Depression	55 km/h (35 mph)	Not Specified			
BOB 03	August 15 – 19, 1984	Deep Depression	55 km/h (35 mph)	Not Specified			
ARB 07	December 3 – 5, 1984	Deep Depression	55 km/h (35 mph)	Not Specified			
BOB 03	August 1 – 2, 1985	Depression	Not Specified	Not Specified			
Land	August 5 – 6, 1985	Depression	Not Specified	Not Specified			
BOB 04	August 6 – 9, 1985	Depression	Not Specified	Not Specified			
BOB 05	August 14 – 15, 1985	Depression	Not Specified	Not Specified			
Land	September 23 – 24, 1985	Depression	Not Specified	Not Specified			
BOB 07	October 1 – 2, 1985	Depression	Not Specified	Not Specified			
ARB 07	October 6 – 9, 1985	Depression	Not Specified	Not Specified			
BOB 11	November 12, 1985	Depression	Not Specified	Not Specified			
BOB 01	January 7 – 8, 1986	Depression	Not Specified	Not Specified			
Land	July 22 – 23, 1986	Depression	Not Specified	Not Specified			
Land	August 8 – 10, 1986	Deep Depression	Not Specified	Not Specified			
BOB 04	August 10 – 15, 1986	Deep Depression	Not Specified	Not Specified			
BOB 05	August 19 – 20, 1986	Depression	Not Specified	Not Specified			
BOB 06	September 24 – 26, 1986	Depression	Not Specified	Not Specified			
ARB 08	November 9 – 10, 1986	Deep Depression	Not Specified	Not Specified			
Land	August 26 – 29, 1987	Depression	Not Specified	Not Specified			
Land	September 11 – 12, 1987	Depression	Not Specified	Not Specified			
Land	September 15 – 16, 1987	Depression	Not Specified	Not Specified			
	December 19 – 22, 1987	Deep Depression	Not Specified	Not Specified			
	June 8 – 10, 1988	Deep Depression	Not Specified	Not Specified			
	June 9 – 13, 1988	Deep Depression	Not Specified	Not Specified			
	July 17 – 18, 1988	Depression	Not Specified	Not Specified			
	August 2 – 6, 1988	Deep Depression	Not Specified	Not Specified			
	October 1 – 3, 1988	Deep Depression	Not Specified	Not Specified			
	December 6 – 8, 1988	Depression	Not Specified	Not Specified			
	June 9 – 12, 1989	Deep Depression	Not Specified	Not Specified			
	June 12 – 14, 1989	Deep Depression	Not Specified	Not Specified			
	June 20 – 21, 1989	Depression	Not Specified	Not Specified			
	August 16 – 17, 1989	Deep Depression	Not Specified	Not Specified			
	October 17 – 18, 1989	Depression	Not Specified	Not Specified			
	November 11, 1989	Depression	Not Specified	Not Specified			
	November 16 – 20, 1989	Depression	Not Specified	Not Specified			
Land	May 15 – 16, 1990	Depression	Not Specified	Not Specified			
BOB 02	June 13 – 15, 1990	Deep Depression	55 km/h (35 mph)	990 hPa (29.23 inHg)			
BOB 03	August 14 – 17, 1990	Depression	50 km/h (31 mph)	993 hPa (29.32 inHg)			
BOB 04	August 20 – 24, 1990	Depression	50 km/h (31 mph)	986 hPa (29.12 inHg)			
BOB 05	September 3 – 5, 1990	Depression	50 km/h (31 mph)	986 hPa (29.12 inHg)			
BOB 06	October 6 – 9, 1990	Deep Depression	50 km/h (31 mph)	998 hPa (29.47 inHg)			
BOB 07	October 31 – November 4, 1990	Deep Depression	50 km/h (31 mph)	1001 hPa (29.56 inHg)			
BOB 08	November 14, 1990	Depression	50 km/h (31 mph)	1008 hPa (29.77 inHg)			
ARB 01	November 16 – 18, 1990	Deep Depression	50 km/h (31 mph)	1007 hPa (29.74 inHg)			
BOB 03	July 27 – 31, 1991	Deep Depression	55 km/h (35 mph)	984 hPa (29.06 inHg)			
BOB 04	August 21 – 26, 1991	Depression	45 km/h (30 mph)	992 hPa (29.29 inHg)	India		
BOB 05	September 21 – 22, 1991	Depression	45 km/h (30 mph)	1000 hPa (29.53 inHg)			
BOB 06	October 12 – 14, 1991	Depression	45 km/h (30 mph)	998 hPa (29.47 inHg)			
BOB 07	October 28 – 30, 1991	Depression	45 km/h (30 mph)	998 hPa (29.47 inHg)			
BOB 02	June 17 – 18	Deep Depression	55 km/h (35 mph)	980 hPa (28.94 inHg)	Odisha		
BOB 03	July 25 – 27	Deep Depression	55 km/h (35 mph)	984 hPa (29.06 inHg)			
BOB 04	October 6 – 9, 1992	Deep Depression	55 km/h (35 mph)	998 hPa (29.47 inHg)	Andhra Pradesh		
ARB 03	November 30 – December 3, 1992	Depression	45 km/h (30 mph)	987 hPa (29.15 inHg)			
ARB 04	December 20 – 24, 1992	Deep Depression	55 km/h (35 mph)	1002 hPa (29.59 inHg)			
BOB 01	June 17 – 19, 1993	Deep Depression	55 km/h (35 mph)	988 hPa (29.18 inHg)			
BOB 03	December 19 – 20, 1993	Deep Depression	55 km/h (35 mph)	1006 hPa (29.71 inHg)			
BOB 01	March 21 – 24, 1994	Depression	45 km/h (30 mph)	Not Specified	None	None	None
Unnamed	August 17 - 20, 1994	Deep Depression	55 km/h (35 mph)	988 hPa (29.18 inHg)	India, Pakistan	None	None
Unnamed	October 4 - 7, 1994	Deep Depression	55 km/h (35 mph)	998 hPa (29.47 inHg)	India		38
Unnamed	November 4 - 5, 1994	Depression	45 km/h (30 mph)	Not Specified	Southern India	None	None
BOB 01	May 5 - 7, 1995	Deep depression	55 km/h (35 mph)	996 hPa (29.41 inHg)	South India	39	
BOB 02	May 8 – 10, 1995	Deep depression	55 km/h (35 mph)	996 hPa (29.41 inHg)	South India	39	
BOB 03	May 14 – 18, 1995	Deep depression	55 km/h (35 mph)	996 hPa (29.41 inHg)	Odisha	107	Unknown
BOB 04	September 15 – 17, 1995	Depression	45 km/h (30 mph)	998 hPa (29.47 inHg)	Myanmar, Odisha, East India	None	None
BOB 05	September 26 – 28, 1995	Depression	45 km/h (30 mph)	1000 hPa (29.53 inHg)	West Bengal, East India	None	None
ARB 02	June 10 – 13, 2004	Deep Depression	55 km/h (35 mph)	992 hPa (29.29 inHg)			
BOB 02	June 11 – 14, 2004	Deep Depression	55 km/h (35 mph)	992 hPa (29.29 inHg)			
Land	September 12 – 15, 2004	Depression	45 km/h (30 mph)	996 hPa (29.41 inHg)			
Land	October 2 – 10, 2004	Depression	45 km/h (30 mph)	996 hPa (29.41 inHg)			
ARB 01	June 21 – 22, 2005	Depression	45 km/h (30 mph)	992 hPa (29.29 inHg)			
Land	June 27 – July 5, 2005	Depression	45 km/h (30 mph)	990 hPa (29.23 inHg)			
BOB 02	July 29 – 31, 2005	Deep Depression	55 km/h (35 mph)	988 hPa (29.18 inHg)			
BOB 03	September 12 – 16, 2005	Depression	45 km/h (30 mph)	992 hPa (29.29 inHg)			
ARB 02	September 14 – 16, 2005	Depression	45 km/h (30 mph)	996 hPa (29.41 inHg)			
BOB 04	October 26 – 29, 2005	Deep Depression	55 km/h (35 mph)	1000 hPa (29.53 inHg)			
BOB 05	November 20 – 22, 2005	Depression	45 km/h (30 mph)	1002 hPa (29.59 inHg)			
BOB 08	December 15 – 22, 2005	Deep Depression	55 km/h (35 mph)	1000 hPa (29.53 inHg)			
ARB 01	January 13 – 14, 2006	Deep Depression	55 km/h (35 mph)	1004 hPa (29.65 inHg)			
BOB 02	July 2 – 5, 2006	Deep Depression	55 km/h (35 mph)	982 hPa (29.00 inHg)			
BOB 03	August 2 – 5, 2006	Deep Depression	55 km/h (35 mph)	986 hPa (29.12 inHg)			
BOB 04	August 12 – 13, 2006	Depression	45 km/h (30 mph)	992 hPa (29.29 inHg)			
BOB 05	August 16 – 18, 2006	Depression	45 km/h (30 mph)	988 hPa (29.18 inHg)			
BOB 06	August 29 – September 1, 2006	Depression	45 km/h (30 mph)	990 hPa (29.23 inHg)			
BOB 07	September 3 – 4, 2006	Depression	45 km/h (30 mph)	992 hPa (29.29 inHg)			
Land	September 21 – 24, 2006	Depression	45 km/h (30 mph)	996 hPa (29.41 inHg)			
BOB 08	September 28 – 30, 2006	Depression	45 km/h (30 mph)	1002 hPa (29.59 inHg)			
BOB 01	May 1 – 5, 2007	Depression	45 km/h (30 mph)	998 hPa (29.47 inHg)			
BOB 04	June 28 – 30, 2007	Deep Depression	55 km/h (35 mph)	989 hPa (29.21 inHg)			
BOB 05	July 4 – 9, 2007	Deep Depression	55 km/h (35 mph)	988 hPa (29.18 inHg)			
BOB 06	August 5 – 7, 2007	Deep Depression	55 km/h (35 mph)	984 hPa (29.06 inHg)			
BOB 07	September 21 – 24, 2007	Depression	45 km/h (30 mph)	990 hPa (29.23 inHg)			
BOB 08	October 27 – 29, 2007	Depression	45 km/h (30 mph)	1004 hPa (29.65 inHg)			
ARB 02	October 27 – November 2, 2007	Deep Depression	55 km/h (35 mph)	1000 hPa (29.53 inHg)			
ARB 01	June 5 – 7, 2008	Depression	45 km/h (30 mph)	994 hPa (29.35 inHg)			
BOB 02	June 16 – 18, 2008	Depression	45 km/h (30 mph)	988 hPa (29.18 inHg)			
BOB 03	August 9–10, 2008	Depression	45 km/h (30 mph)	1004 hPa (29.65 inHg)			
BOB 04	September 14 – 19, 2008	Deep Depression	55 km/h (35 mph)	986 hPa (29.12 inHg)			
ARB 02	October 19 – 23, 2008	Deep Depression	55 km/h (35 mph)	1000 hPa (29.53 inHg)			
BOB 08	December 4–8, 2008	Deep Depression	55 km/h (35 mph)	996 hPa (29.41 inHg)	Sri Lanka, India	None	0
ARB 01	June 23 – 24, 2009	Depression	45 km/h (30 mph)	998 hPa (29.47 inHg)	India		9
ARB 02	June 25 – 26, 2009	Depression	45 km/h (30 mph)	998 hPa (29.47 inHg)	India		
BOB 03	July 20 – 21, 2009	Deep Depression	55 km/h (35 mph)	988 hPa (29.18 inHg)			
BOB 04	September 5 – 7, 2009	Deep Depression	55 km/h (35 mph)	990 hPa (29.23 inHg)			
BOB 02	October 7 – 9, 2010	Depression	45 km/h (30 mph)	996 hPa (29.41 inHg)			
BOB 03	October 13 – 16, 2010	Deep Depression	65 km/h (40 mph)	995 hPa (29.38 inHg)			
BOB 06	December 7 – 8, 2010	Depression	45 km/h (30 mph)	1000 hPa (29.53 inHg)			
BOB 01	February 2 – 3, 2011	Depression	45 km/h (30 mph)	1000 hPa (29.53 inHg)			
ARB 01	June 11 – 12, 2011	Depression	45 km/h (30 mph)	996 hPa (29.41 inHg)			
BOB 02	June 16 – 23, 2011	Deep Depression	65 km/h (40 mph)	978 hPa (28.88 inHg)			
Land	July 22 – 23, 2011	Depression	37 km/h (23 mph)	990 hPa (29.23 inHg)			
BOB 03	September 22 – 23, 2011	Depression	45 km/h (30 mph)	995 hPa (29.38 inHg)			
BOB 04	October 19 – 20, 2011	Deep Depression	55 km/h (35 mph)	1000 hPa (29.53 inHg)			
ARB 03	November 6 – 10, 2011	Deep Depression	55 km/h (35 mph)	1000 hPa (29.53 inHg)			
ARB 04	November 26 – December 1, 2011	Deep Depression	55 km/h (35 mph)	998 hPa (29.47 inHg)			
BOB 01	October 10 – 11, 2012	Deep Depression	55 km/h (35 mph)	1002 hPa (29.59 inHg)			
BOB 03	November 17 – 19, 2012	Deep Depression	55 km/h (35 mph)	1002 hPa (29.59 inHg)			
ARB 02	December 22 – 24, 2012	Deep Depression	55 km/h (35 mph)	1002 hPa (29.59 inHg)			
BOB 02	May 29 – 31, 2013	Depression	45 km/h (30 mph)	990 hPa (29.23 inHg)			
BOB 03	July 30 – August 1, 2013	Depression	45 km/h (30 mph)	990 hPa (29.23 inHg)			
Land	August 20 – 23, 2013	Depression	45 km/h (30 mph)	990 hPa (29.23 inHg)			
ARB 01	November 8 – 11, 2013	Deep Depression	55 km/h (35 mph)	1002 hPa (29.59 inHg)			
Wilma	November 13 – 17, 2013	Depression	45 km/h (30 mph)	1003 hPa (29.62 inHg)			
BOB 01	January 4 – 7, 2014	Depression	45 km/h (30 mph)	1004 hPa (29.65 inHg)	Sri Lanka	Minor	None
BOB 02	May 21 – 23, 2014	Depression	45 km/h (30 mph)	1000 hPa (29.53 inHg)	Andaman and Nicobar Islands, India		
Land	July 21 – 22, 2014	Depression	45 km/h (30 mph)	988 hPa (29.18 inHg)			
Land	August 4 – 8, 2014	Deep depression	55 km/h (35 mph)	988 hPa (29.18 inHg)			
BOB 04	November 5 – 8, 2014	Deep Depression	55 km/h (35 mph)	1000 hPa (29.53 inHg)			
BOB 01	June 20 – 21, 2015	Depression	45 km/h (30 mph)	994 hPa (29.35 inHg)	East India		
ARB 02	June 22 – 24, 2015	Deep Depression	55 km/h (35 mph)	988 hPa (29.18 inHg)	West India		
Land	July 10 – 12, 2015	Depression	45 km/h (30 mph)	994 hPa (29.35 inHg)	North India, Nepal	None	None
Land	July 27 – 30, 2015	Deep Depression	55 km/h (35 mph)	994 hPa (29.35 inHg)	Central India	None	None
Land	August 4, 2015	Depression	45 km/h (30 mph)	998 hPa (29.47 inHg)	Central India	None	None
Land	September 16 – 19, 2015	Deep Depression	55 km/h (35 mph)	996 hPa (29.41 inHg)	Central India	None	None
ARB 03	October 9 – 12, 2015	Deep Depression	55 km/h (35 mph)	1000 hPa (29.53 inHg)	None	None	None
BOB 03	November 8 – 10, 2015	Deep Depression	55 km/h (35 mph)	991 hPa (29.26 inHg)	South India, Sri Lanka	Unknown	71
ARB 01	June 27 – 29, 2016	Depression	45 km/h (30 mph)	996 hPa (29.41 inHg)	Oman, Gujarat	None	None
Land	July 6 – 7, 2016	Depression	45 km/h (30 mph)	996 hPa (29.41 inHg)	East India	Unknown	None
Land	August 9 – 12, 2016	Deep Depression	55 km/h (35 mph)	994 hPa (29.35 inHg)	East India, Bangladesh	Minimal	20
BOB 02	August 16 – 20, 2016	Depression	45 km/h (30 mph)	994 hPa (29.35 inHg)	East India, Bangladesh	Unknown	17
BOB 04	November 2 – 6, 2016	Depression	45 km/h (30 mph)	1000 hPa (29.53 inHg)	Malaysia, Thailand, West Bengal, Bangladesh	Unknown	80
ARB 02	December 17 – 18, 2016	Depression	45 km/h (30 mph)	994 hPa (29.35 inHg)	Somalia	Unknown	None
BOB 03	June 11 – 13, 2017	Deep Depression	55 km/h (35 mph)	988 hPa (29.18 inHg)	Northeast India, Bangladesh		
BOB 04	July 18 – 19, 2017	Depression	45 km/h (30 mph)	992 hPa (29.29 inHg)	Orissa, Madhya Pradesh, Chhattisgarh		
Land	July 26 – 27, 2017	Depression	45 km/h (30 mph)	992 hPa (29.29 inHg)	West Bengal, Jharkhand, Madhya Pradesh		
Land	October 8 – 10, 2017	Deep Depression	55 km/h (35 mph)	996 hPa (29.41 inHg)	Bangladesh, West Bengal, Jharkhand, Odisha, Andhra Pradesh	Unknown	7
BOB 05	October 18 – 22, 2017	Depression	45 km/h (30 mph)	999 hPa (29.50 inHg)	Odisha, West Bengal, Northeastern India, Bangladesh	Unknown	1
BOB 06	November 15 – 17, 2017	Depression	45 km/h (30 mph)	1000 hPa (29.53 inHg)	Odisha, West Bengal, Andhra Pradesh	Unknown	20
BOB 08	December 5 – 9, 2017	Deep Depression	55 km/h (35 mph)	1002 hPa (29.59 inHg)			
ARB 01	March 13 – 14, 2018	Depression	45 km/h (30 mph)	1006 hPa (29.71 inHg)	South India, Maldives	None	None
BOB 01	May 29 – 30, 2018	Deep Depression	55 km/h (35 mph)	992 hPa (29.29 inHg)	Myanmar	None	5
BOB 02	June 10 – 10, 2018	Depression	45 km/h (30 mph)	988 hPa (29.18 inHg)	Bangladesh	None	None
BOB 03	July 21 – 23, 2018	Deep Depression	55 km/h (35 mph)	988 hPa (29.18 inHg)	East India, North India	Unknown	69
BOB 04	August 7 – 8, 2018	Depression	45 km/h (30 mph)	992 hPa (29.29 inHg)	East India	None	None
BOB 05	August 15 – 17, 2018	Depression	45 km/h (30 mph)	993 hPa (29.32 inHg)	East India, Central India, West India	Unknown	None
BOB 06	September 6 – 7, 2018	Deep Depression	55 km/h (35 mph)	990 hPa (29.23 inHg)	East India	Unknown	None
BOB 03	August 6 – 9, 2019	Deep Depression	55 km/h (35 mph)	988 hPa (29.18 inHg)	East India, Bangladesh	Unknown	3
Land	September 30 – October 1, 2019	Depression	45 km/h (30 mph)	1004 hPa (29.65 inHg)			
ARB 06	December 3 – 5, 2019	Deep Depression	55 km/h (35 mph)	1002 hPa (29.59 inHg)	Tamil Nadu	Unknown	25
ARB 08	December 8 – 10, 2019	Deep Depression	55 km/h (35 mph)	1004 hPa (29.65 inHg)	Socotra, Somalia	Unknown	None
ARB 01	May 29 – 31, 2020	Depression	45 km/h (30 mph)	1000 hPa (29.53 inHg)	Oman, Yemen	Unknown	3
BOB 02	October 11 – 14, 2020	Deep depression	55 km/h (35 mph)	999 hPa (29.50 inHg)	India	$681 million	98
ARB 03	October 17 – 19, 2020	Depression	45 km/h (30 mph)	1000 hPa (29.53 inHg)	Maharashtra	Minimal	None
BOB 03	October 22 – 24	Depression	45 km/h (30 mph)	1000 hPa (29.53 inHg)	West Bengal, Bangladesh, Northeast India	Minimal	None

== Other systems ==
Over the years, other systems have been classified as a tropical depression, by other warning centres such as the United States Joint Typhoon Warning Center, Thai or Bangladesh Meteorological Departments. However, these systems have not been formally recognised as a cyclonic disturbance by the IMD.

== Climatology ==
Month of formation	Depressions	Deep Depressions	Total
January	2	2	4
February	1	0	1
March	2	0	2
April	0	0	0
May	7	9	16
June	22	27	49
July	21	25	46
August	41	28	69
September	32	15	47
October	22	25	47
November	13	18	31
December	10	9	19
Total	173	158	331

Decade	Depressions	Deep Depressions	Total
Pre 1960s	2	2	4
1960	1	0	1
1970	35	48	83
1980	47	26	73
1990	19	28	47
2000	27	22	49
2010	30	26	56
2020	1	0	1
Total	173	158	331

== See also ==
- South-West Indian Ocean tropical cyclone
