= 2020 Hyderabad floods =

Heavy rains resulting in flash flooding in Hyderabad, India

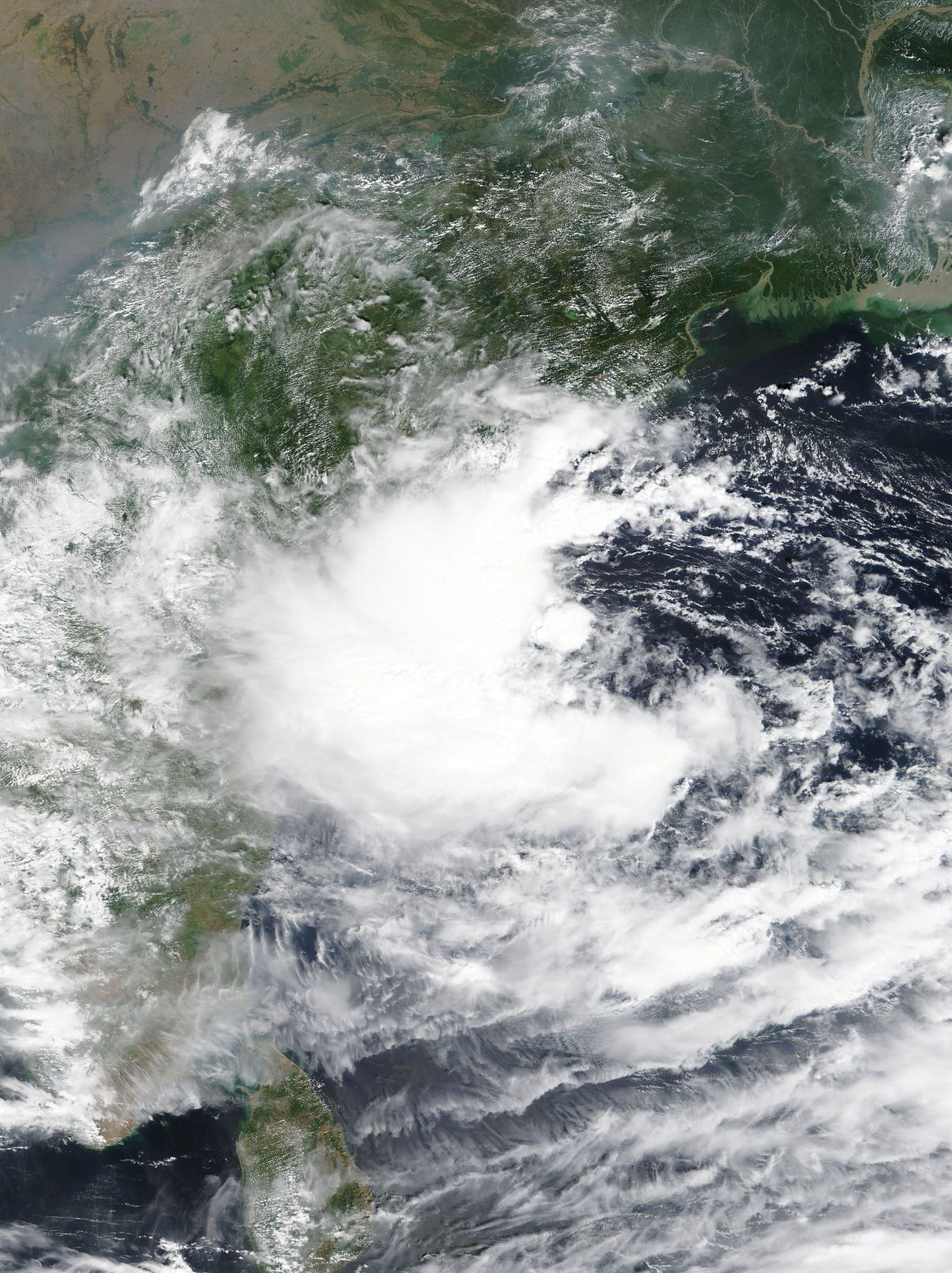
- Deep Depression BOB 02 at its peak intensity

Meteorological history
- Formed: 11 October 2020
- Dissipated: 14 October 2020

Deep depression
- 3-minute sustained (IMD)
- Highest winds: 55 km/h (35 mph)
- Lowest pressure: 999 hPa (mbar); 29.50 inHg

Overall effects
- Fatalities: 104 total
- Damage: $1.23 billion (2020 USD)
- Areas affected: India (Andhra Pradesh, Telangana, Puducherry, Karnataka, Kerala, Goa, Maharashtra)
- Part of the 2020 North Indian Ocean cyclone season

The 2020 Hyderabad floods were a series of floods associated with Deep Depression BOB 02 that caused extensive damage and loss of life as a result of flash flooding in Hyderabad, India in October 2020. The fourth tropical cyclone and third deep depression of the 2020 North Indian Ocean cyclone season, BOB 02 formed on 11 October over the west-central Bay of Bengal and slowly drifted west-northwest, towards the east coast of India over the following days. The depression made landfall in Andhra Pradesh early on 13 October, and dissipated on the next day.

Despite remained weak while striking south-central India, the system brought torrential rains and triggered flooding in the region. Hyderabad, the capital city of Telangana, experienced record-breaking rainfall and led to flash floods in the city. Over 100 people were killed by the floods, including 72 in Telangana. The state reported a loss of ₹9,000 crore (US$1.23 billion).

== Weather systems ==
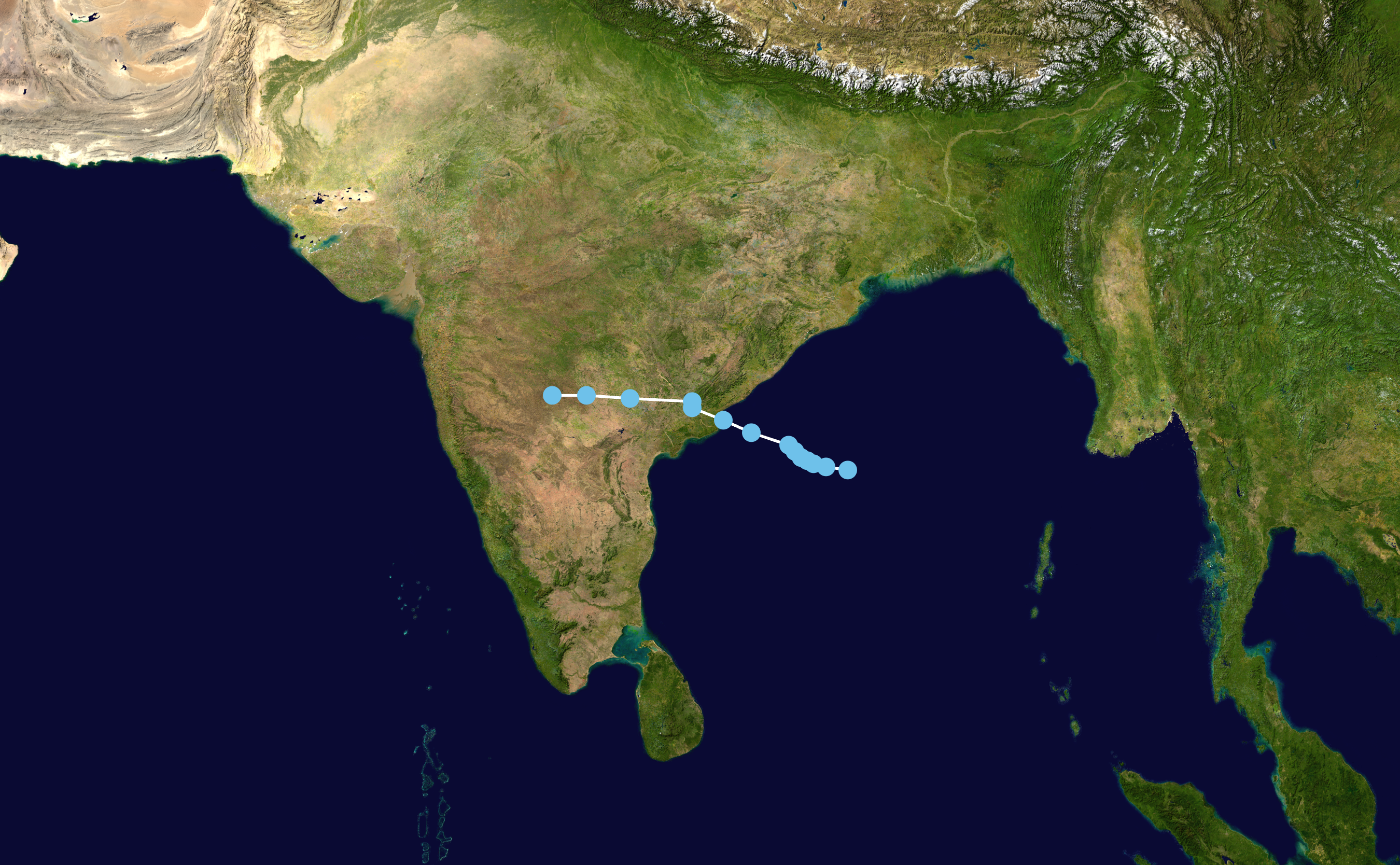
Map plotting the storm's track and intensity, according to the Saffir–Simpson scale Map key Saffir–Simpson scale Tropical depression (≤38 mph, ≤62 km/h) Tropical storm (39–73 mph, 63–118 km/h) Category 1 (74–95 mph, 119–153 km/h) Category 2 (96–110 mph, 154–177 km/h) Category 3 (111–129 mph, 178–208 km/h) Category 4 (130–156 mph, 209–251 km/h) Category 5 (≥157 mph, ≥252 km/h) Unknown Storm type Tropical cyclone Subtropical cyclone Extratropical cyclone, remnant low, tropical disturbance, or monsoon depression

On 11 October, an area of low pressure concentrated into a depression over the west-central Bay of Bengal. It further intensified into a deep depression on 12 October as it moved slowly west-northwestwards. After that, BOB 02 made landfall in Andhra Pradesh near Kakinada in the early hours of 13 October and weakened again into a depression. The system weakened into a well-marked low-pressure area over south-central Maharashtra on the evening of 14 October.

Though the system's low-level circulation was partially exposed due to high vertical wind shear and continuous land interaction, the JTWC re-issued a tropical cyclone advisory on 15 October. The IMD also forecasted BOB 02 to reintensify in the Arabian Sea. The low-pressure area intensified into Depression ARB 03 in the early hours of 17 October. The system delayed the withdrawal of southwest monsoon season by almost a week.

== Impact ==
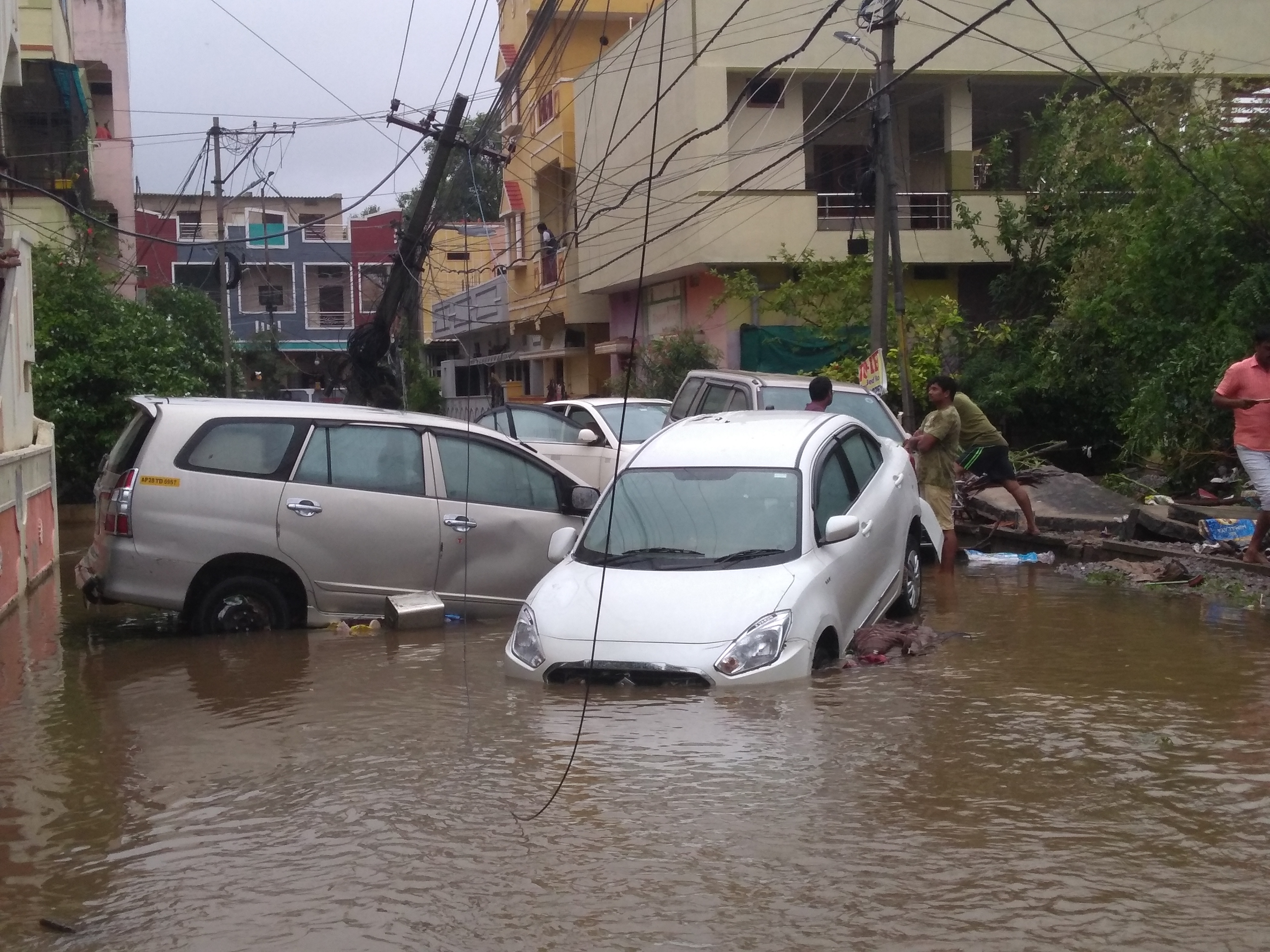
Street flooding submerging cars in Hyderabad

The floodgates of the Himayat Sagar were lifted as the water reached full reservoir levels, and the Musi river flowed full stream, flooding several localities and flowing over two causeway bridges. Due to BOB 02, Puducherry, Andhra Pradesh, Telangana, Kerala, Maharashtra, and coastal Karnataka experienced heavy rain on 12 and 13 October. Ghatkesar, a suburb of Hyderabad, experiencing 324 mm (12.8 in) of record-breaking torrential rain. Many areas in Hyderabad recorded rainfall of over 200 mm (7.9 in), creating flash floods on the city by 13 October.

Four people died in Vijayawada, and 70 people died on different parts of Telangana, including 33 in Hyderabad. Additionally, 28 people died in Maharashtra. Extensive crop loss in north Karnataka, Andhra Pradesh and Telangana occurred due to the system. Total damage estimated by the government of Telangana was near ₹9,000 crore (US$1.23 billion). On 18 October, a second flood killed two more people in Hyderabad. Over 37,000 families were affected by the second flood. Rainfall reached over 110 millimetres (4.3 in) in parts of Hyderabad, with heavier rainfall amounts outside of the city. With over 80 people having lost their lives and about 40,000 families being displaced, post rain gathering up-to 20,000 tons of waste.

== Aftermath ==
360 National Disaster Response Force personnel, as well as Indian Army forces were deployed. The Telangana government requested the Central government to provide relief to Hyderabad and surrounding areas. Chief Minister K. Chandrashekhar Rao wrote a letter to Prime Minister Narendra Modi seeking immediate release of ₹1,350 crore (US$184 million), in which ₹600 crore for farmers and ₹750 crore on relief and rehabilitation works in the Greater Hyderabad Municipal Corporation area. On 14 October, the Telangana Government declared a two-day holiday for all nonessential workers due to flooding, and urged everyone to stay home. Amid the possibility of further flooding, more than 2,100 families were evacuated near Gurram Cheruvu. More than 150,000 meal packets were distributed to flood-affected areas. Furthermore, 60 teams were tasked with spreading bleach in cellars and open areas to prevent the spread of waterborne and vector-borne diseases.

== See also ==
- 2020 North Indian Ocean cyclone season
- Great Musi Flood of 1908
- 2000 Hyderabad floods
- 2019 Patna floods
