= 1974 North Indian Ocean cyclone season =

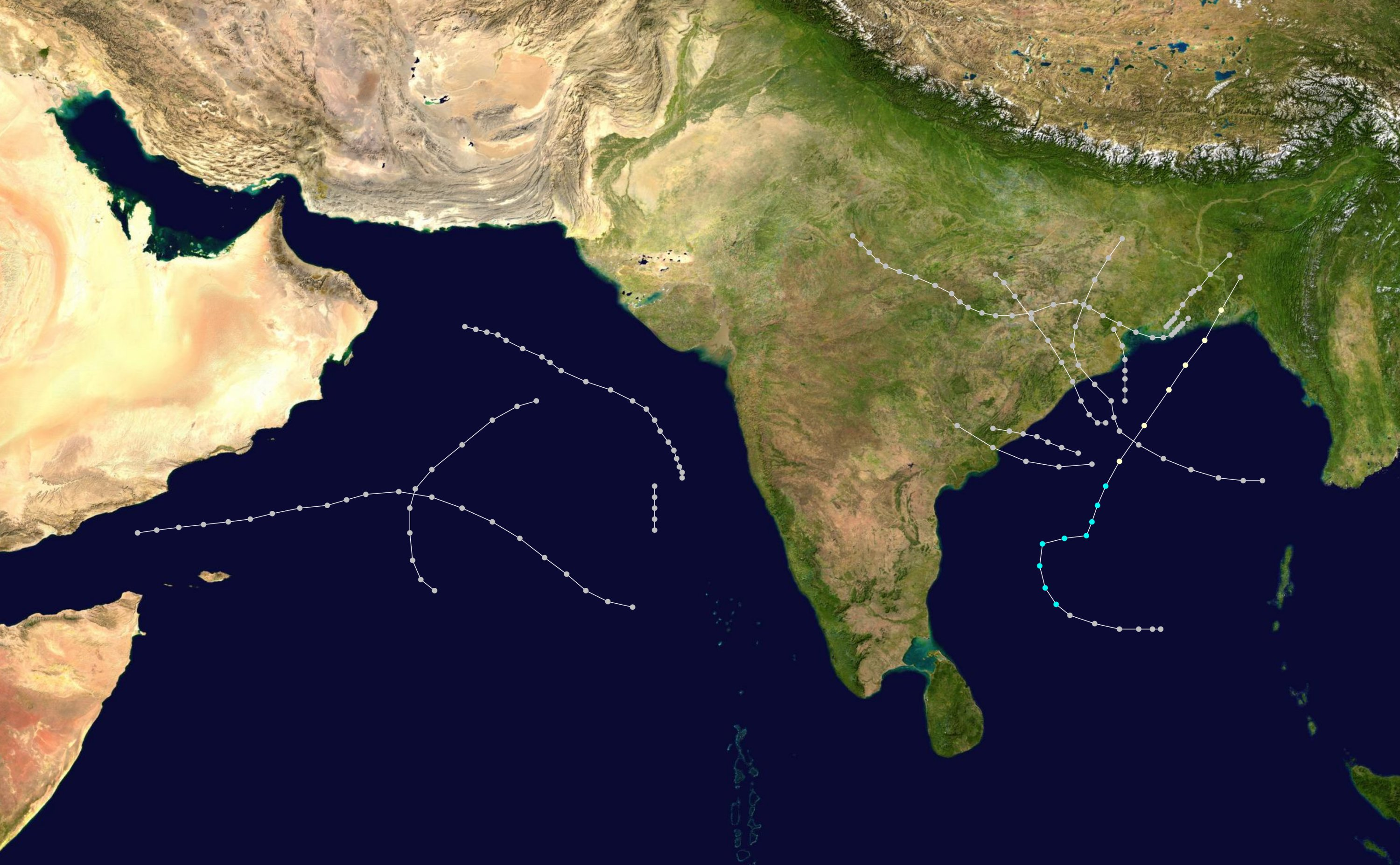
- Season summary map

Seasonal boundaries
- First system formed: April 1974
- Last system dissipated: November 28, 1974

Seasonal statistics
- Depressions: 12
- Cyclonic storms: 7
- Severe cyclonic storms: 3
- Total fatalities: Unknown
- Total damage: Unknown

Related articles
- 1974 Atlantic hurricane season; 1974 Pacific hurricane season; 1974 Pacific typhoon season

The 1974 North Indian Ocean cyclone season was part of the annual cycle of tropical cyclone formation. The season has no official bounds but cyclones tend to form between April and December. These dates conventionally delimit the period of each year when most tropical cyclones form in the northern Indian Ocean. There are two main seas in the North Indian Ocean—the Bay of Bengal to the east of the Indian subcontinent and the Arabian Sea to the west of India. The official Regional Specialized Meteorological Centre in this basin is the India Meteorological Department (IMD), while the Joint Typhoon Warning Center (JTWC) releases unofficial advisories. An average of five tropical cyclones form in the North Indian Ocean every season with peaks in May and November. Cyclones occurring between the meridians 45°E and 100°E are included in the season by the IMD.

== Systems ==
=== Tropical Storm One (01A) ===
- Cyclonic storm (IMD)
- Tropical storm (SSHWS)
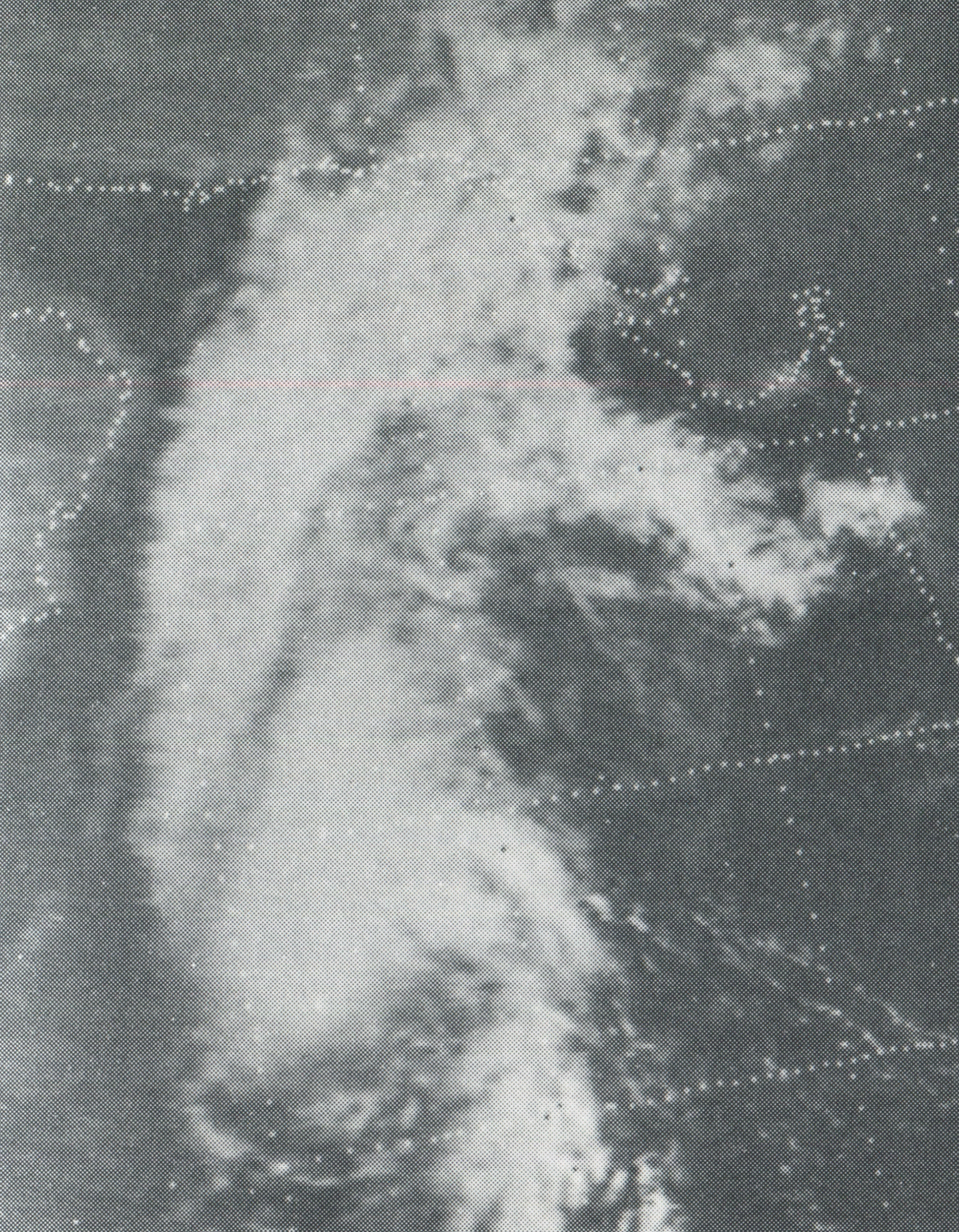
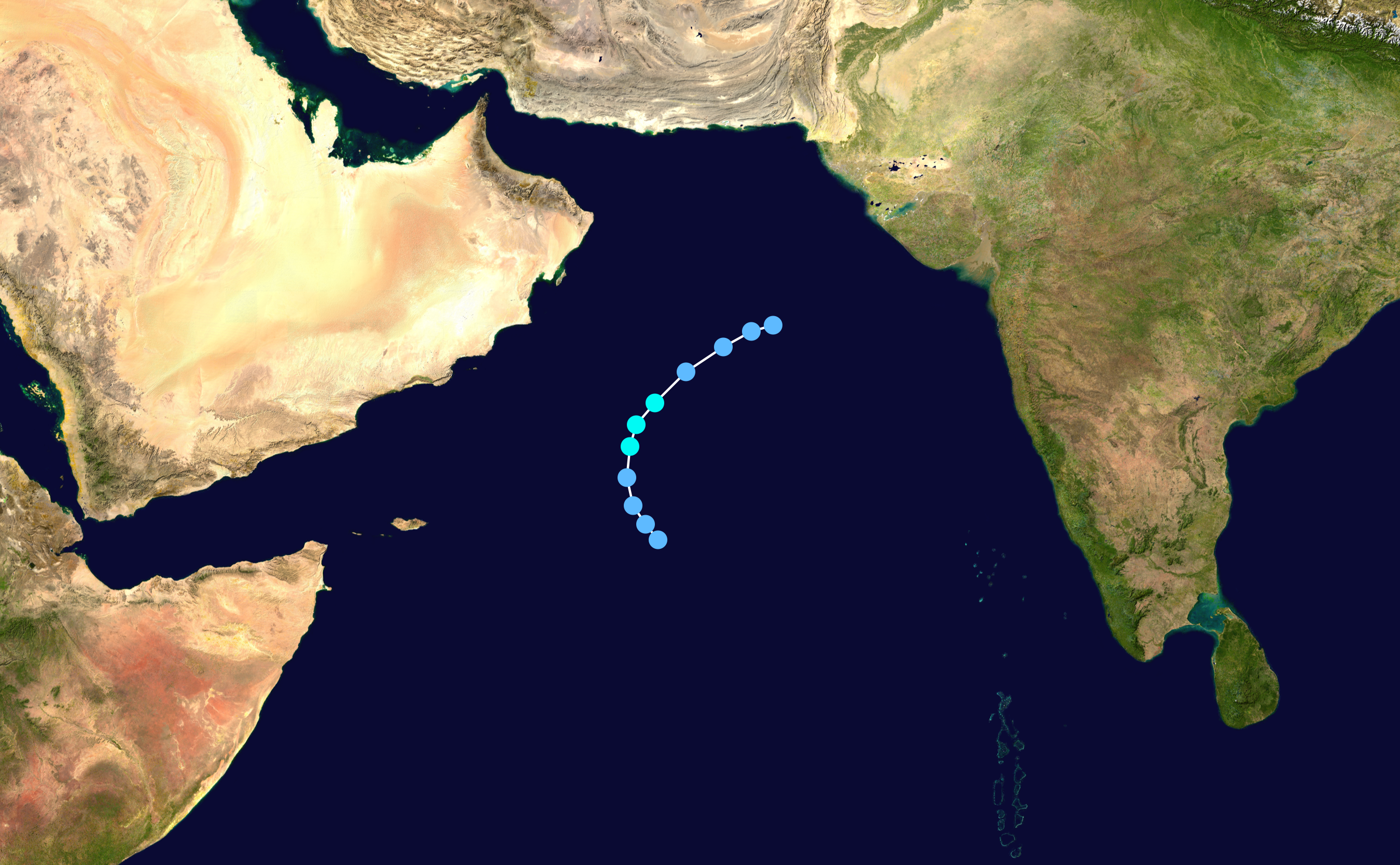
- Duration: April 14 – April 17
- Peak intensity: 65 km/h (40 mph) (3-min);

This cyclone was one of the three rare April cyclone which was formed during first fifteen days of the month during the satellite era. The other cyclones were Cyclone Bijli in 2009 and Cyclone Maarutha in 2017.

=== Tropical Storm Two (02A) ===
- Cyclonic storm (IMD)
- Tropical storm (SSHWS)
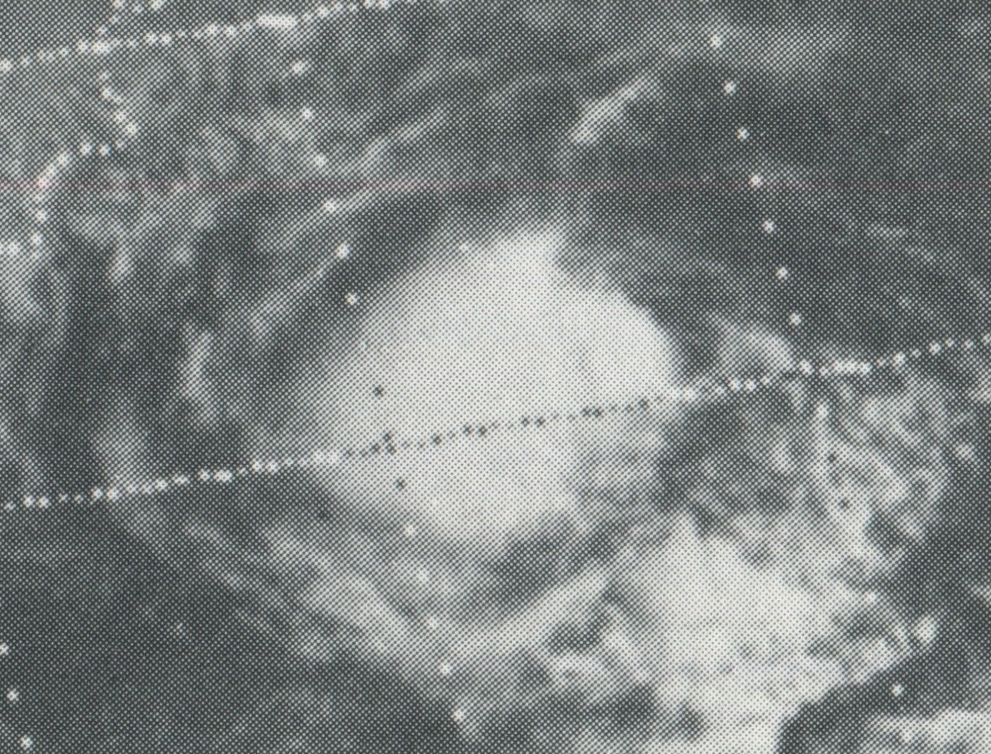
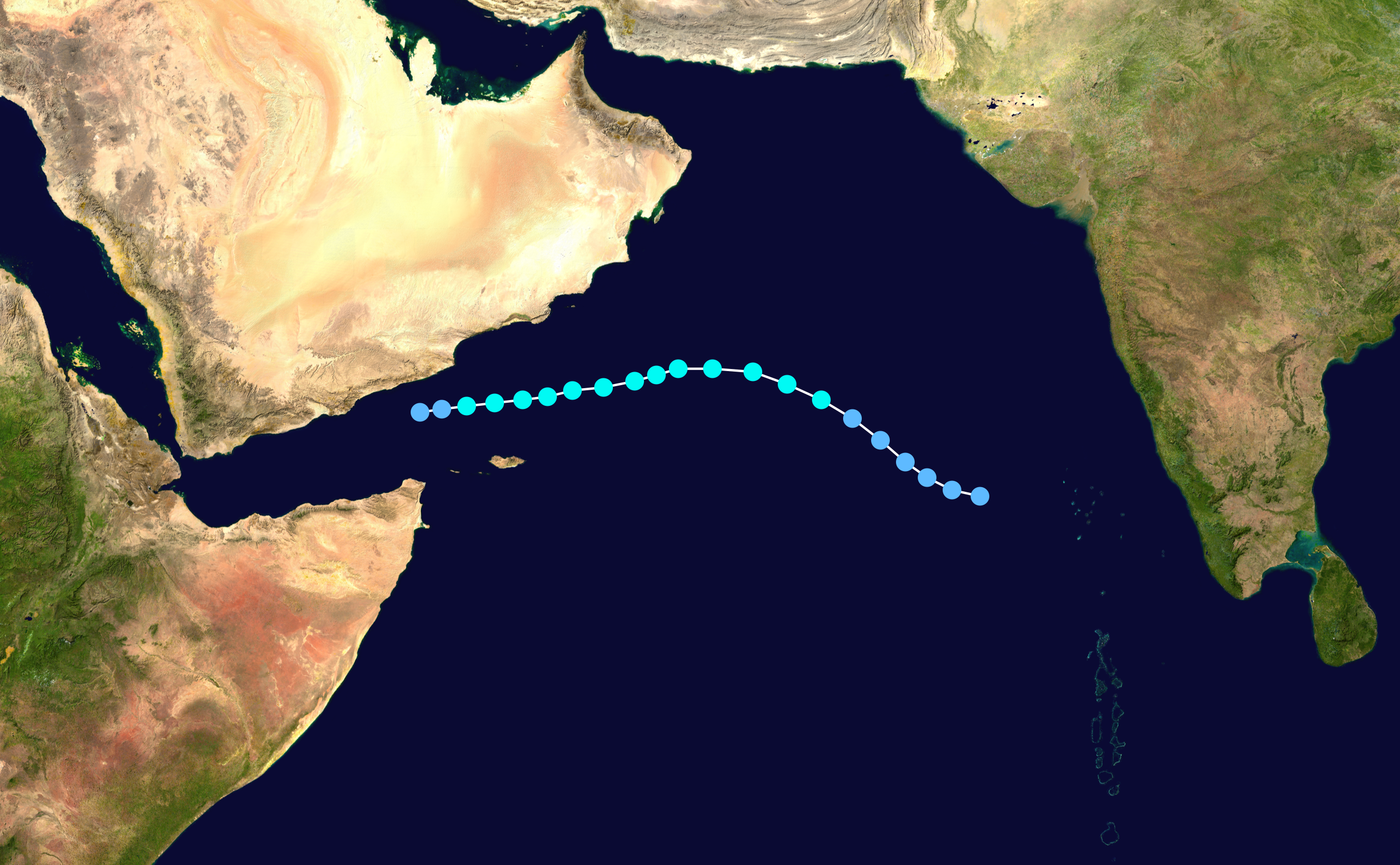
- Duration: May 17 – May 22
- Peak intensity: 75 km/h (45 mph) (3-min);

A system developed in the Arabian Sea in mid-may and a few days later in turned into a cyclonic storm. As it went in a western direction it strengthened and had a max wind blows of 45 mph and it stayed around the far 1 more day before weakening. Later on May 22 it officially got confirmed as gone. Its other statistics are relatively unknown.

=== Tropical Storm Three (03B) ===
- Deep depression (IMD)
- Tropical storm (SSHWS)
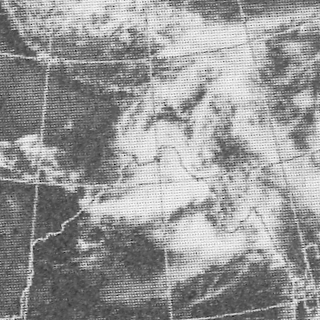
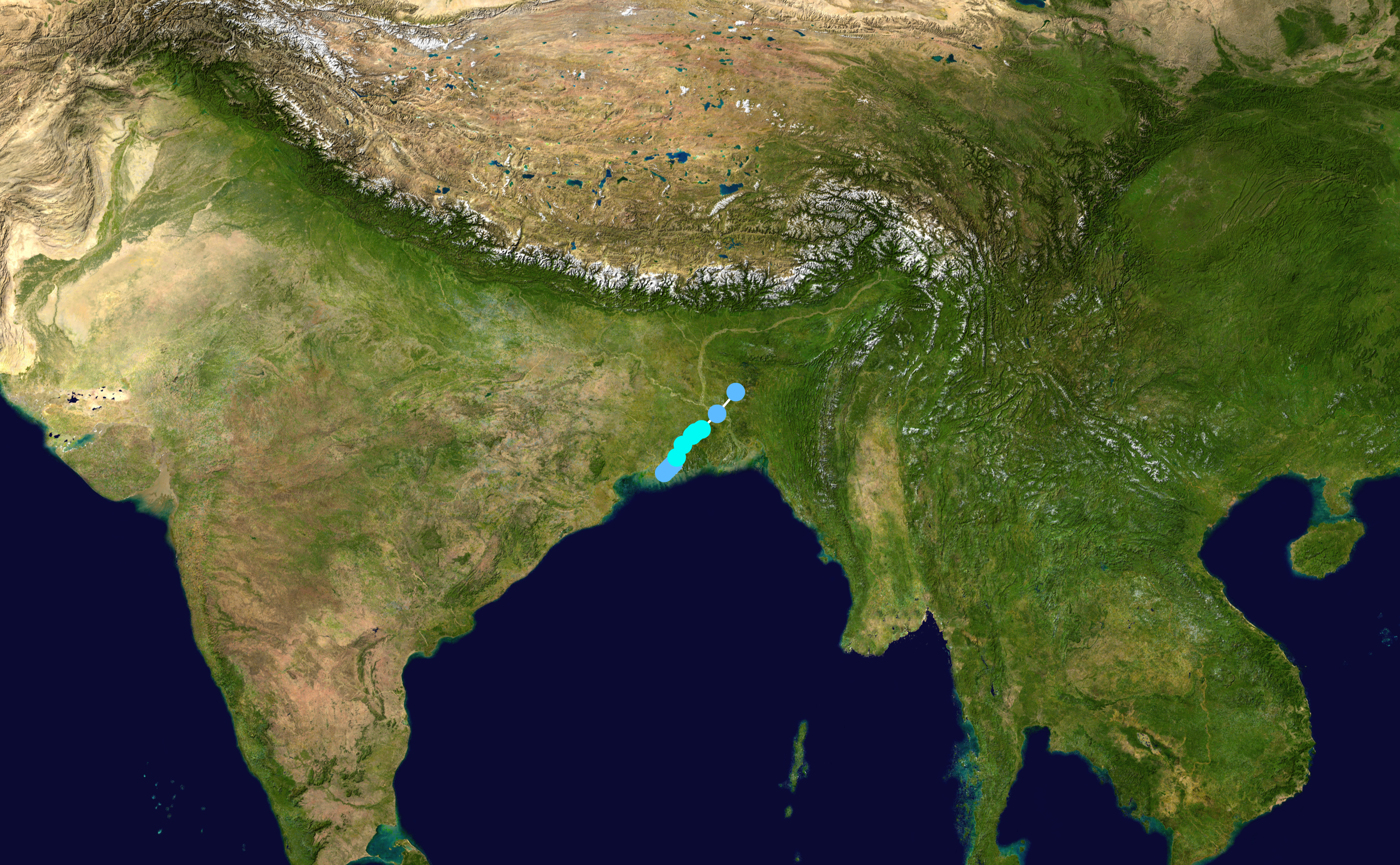
- Duration: May 29 – June 1
- Peak intensity: 55 km/h (35 mph) (3-min);

=== Cyclone Six (06B) ===
- Very severe cyclonic storm (IMD)
- Category 1 tropical cyclone (SSHWS)
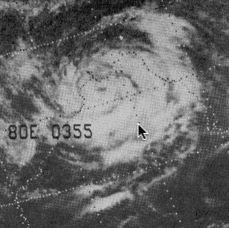
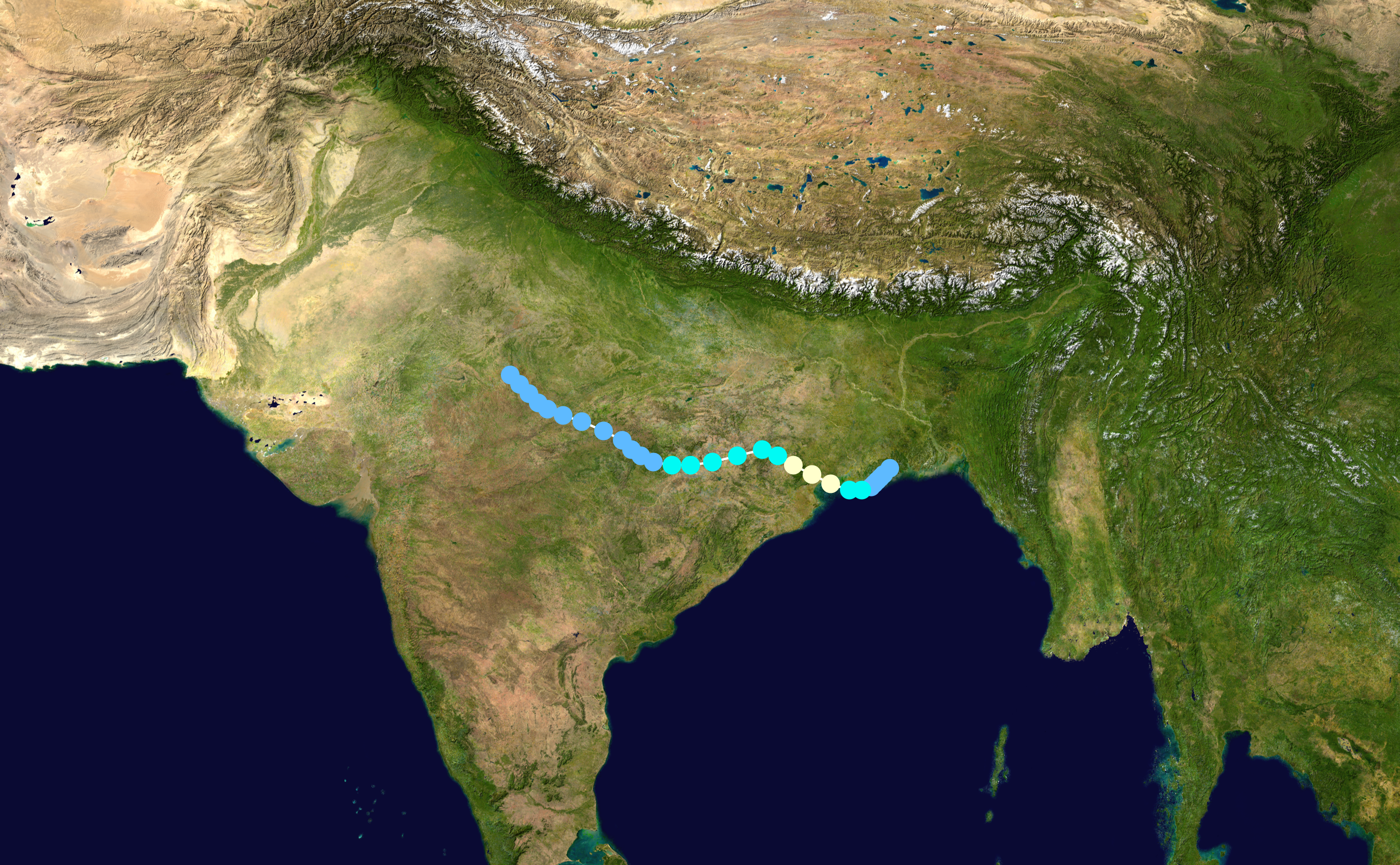
- Duration: August 13 – August 20
- Peak intensity: 130 km/h (80 mph) (3-min);

This cyclone formed on 13 August and reached its peak intensity of a Category 1 storm by the next day. On 15 August, the storm made landfall at Digha in West Bengal. It maintained the intensity of cyclone until 17 August and dissipated on 20 August. The storm caused heavy flooding over West Bengal coastal and deltaic districts. It was a rare August cyclone to peak as a Very Severe Cyclonic Storm.

=== Tropical Storm Seven (07A) ===
- Deep depression (IMD)
- Tropical storm (SSHWS)
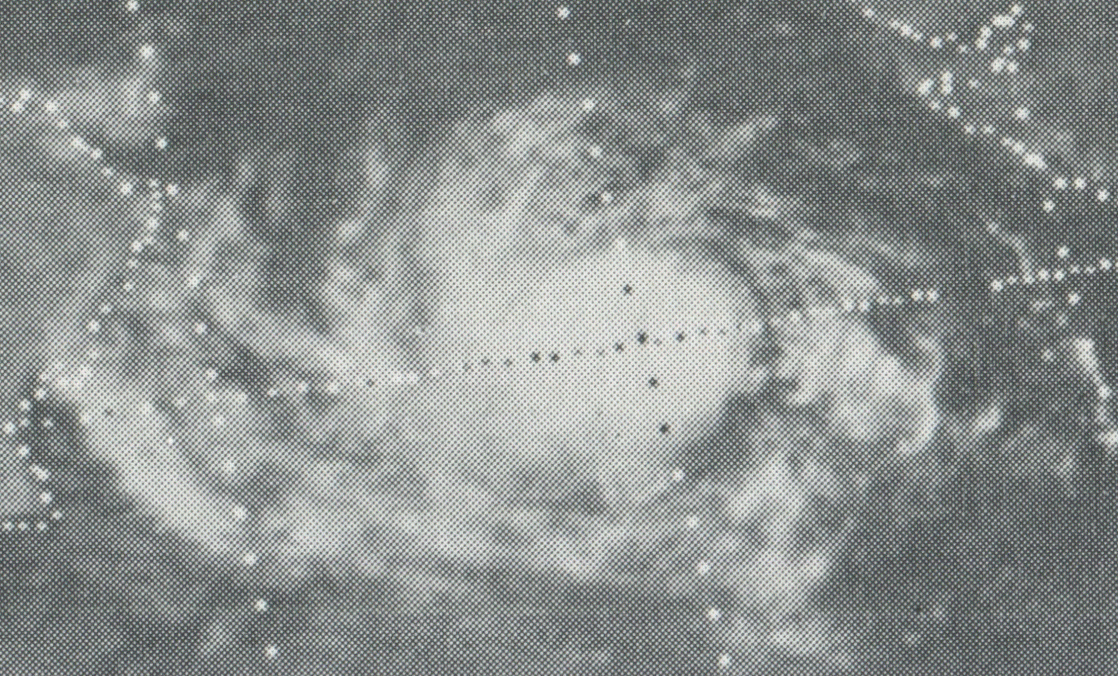
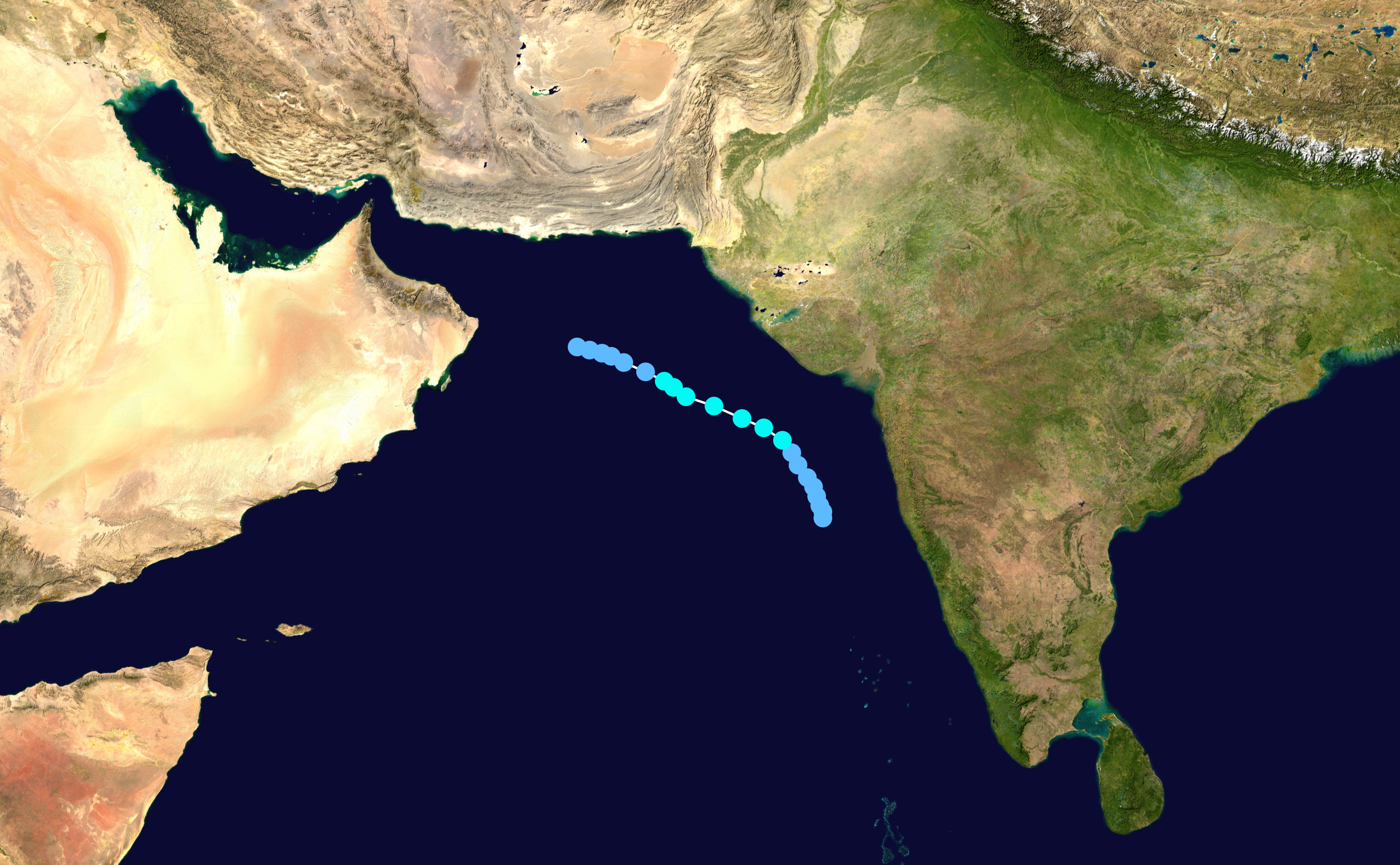
- Duration: September 19 – September 24
- Peak intensity: 55 km/h (35 mph) (3-min);

=== Tropical Storm Eight (08B) ===
- Depression (IMD)
- Tropical storm (SSHWS)
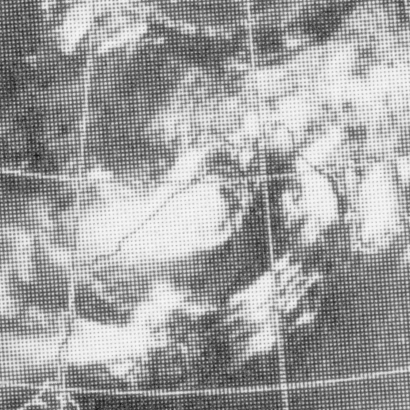
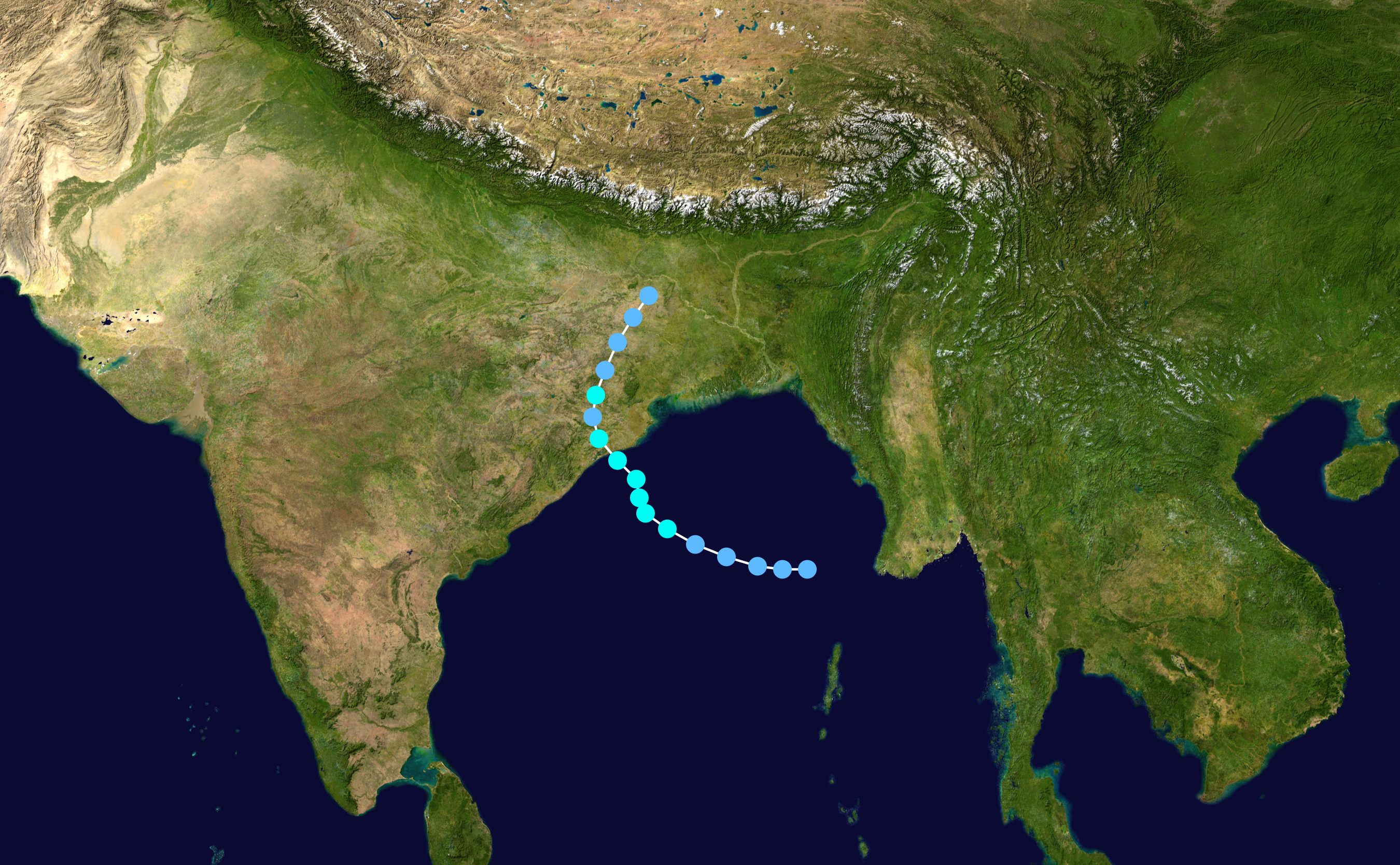
- Duration: September 26 – September 30
- Peak intensity: 45 km/h (30 mph) (3-min);

The system developed in Bay of Bengal and lasted from September 26 until September 30.

=== Cyclone Twelve (12B) ===
- Severe cyclonic storm (IMD)
- Category 1 tropical cyclone (SSHWS)
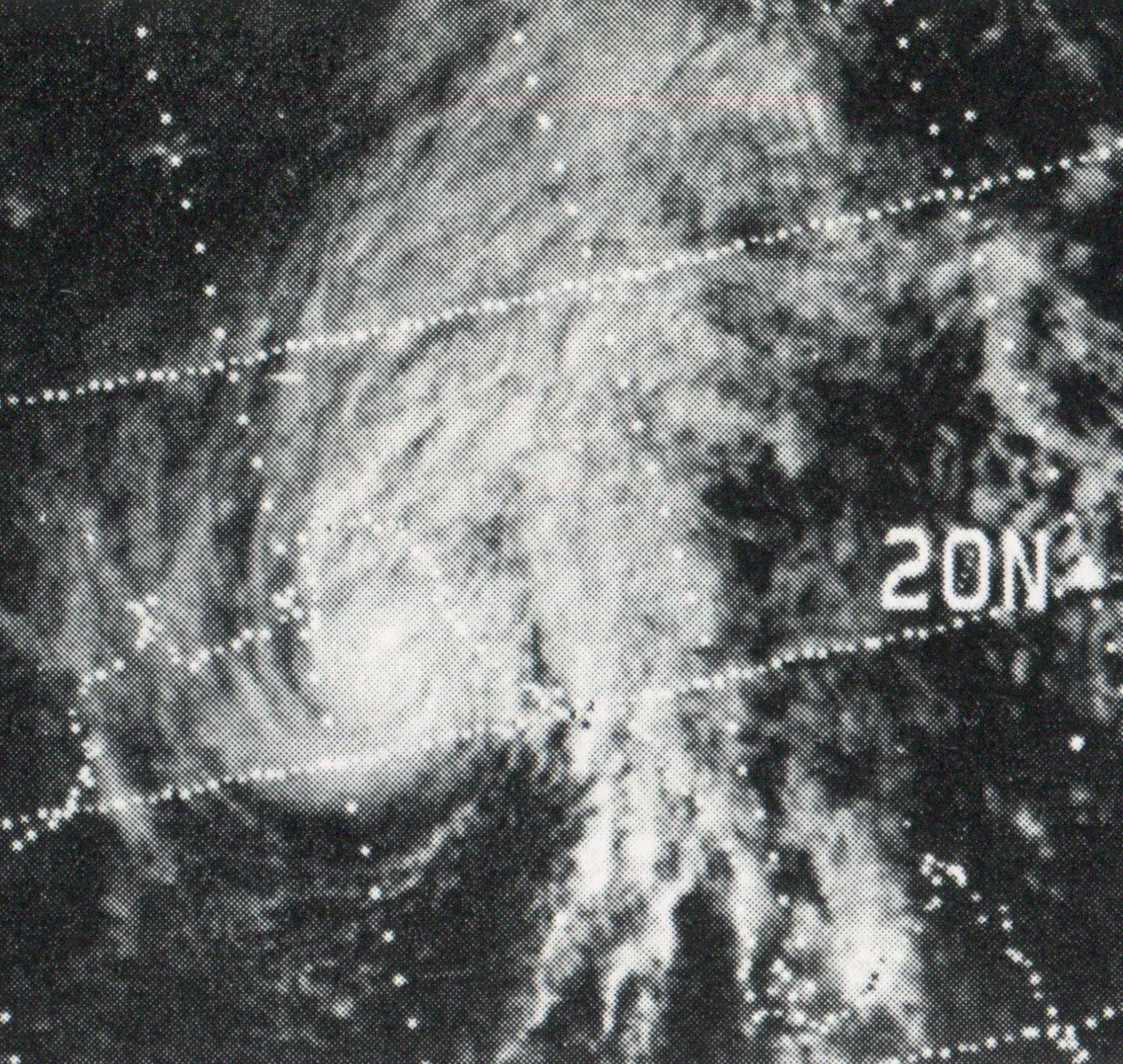
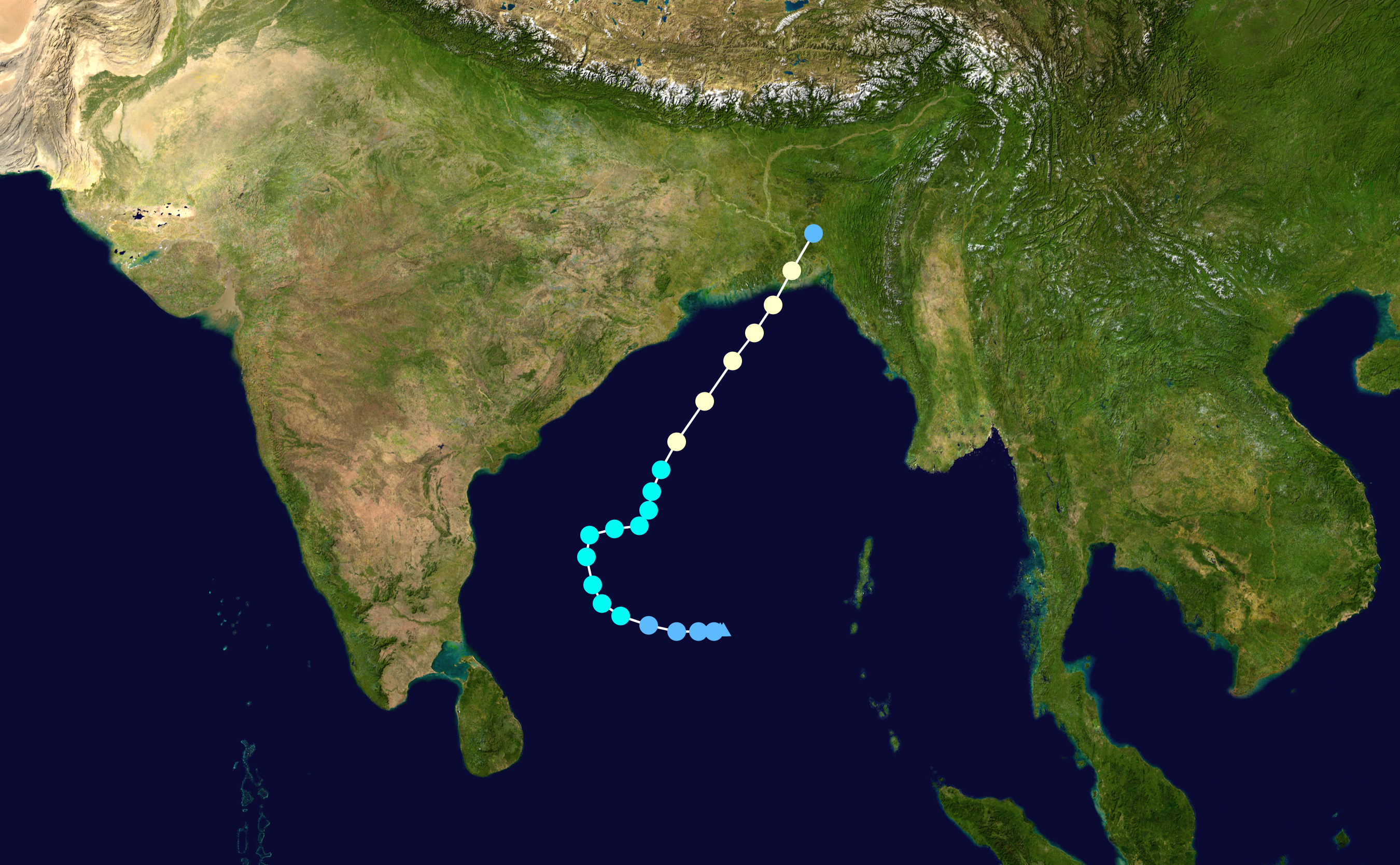
- Duration: November 23 – November 28
- Peak intensity: 110 km/h (70 mph) (3-min);

This system developed off the eastern coast of southern India on November 23 and strengthened as it moved to the northeast. The system nearly reached hurricane strength as it made landfall near Chittagong late on November 28. A 10 feet (3.0 m) storm surge accompanied the system's approach to Bangladesh, which inundated several islands offshore. Less than 100 people perished while thousands were left homeless.

== See also ==
- North Indian Ocean tropical cyclone
- 1974 Atlantic hurricane season
- 1974 Pacific hurricane season
- 1974 Pacific typhoon season
- Australian cyclone seasons: 1973–74, 1974–75
- South Pacific cyclone seasons: 1973–74, 1974–75
- South-West Indian Ocean cyclone seasons: 1973–74, 1974–75
