= List of named storms (A) =

Storms are named for historical reasons to avoid confusion when communicating with the public, as more than one storm can exist at a time. Names are drawn in order from predetermined lists. For tropical cyclones, names are assigned when a system has one-, three-, or ten-minute winds of more than 65 km/h (40 mph). Standards, however, vary from basin to basin. For example, some tropical depressions are named in the Western Pacific, while within the Australian and Southern Pacific regions, the naming of tropical cyclones are delayed until they have gale-force winds occurring more than halfway around the storm center.

This list covers the letter A.

== Storms ==
Note: † indicates the name was retired after that usage in the respective basin

- Abaimba (2003) – a moderate tropical storm that did not significantly affect land.
- Abby

- 1960 – a Category 1 hurricane that made landfall in British Honduras (now Belize).
- 1964 – a tropical storm that made landfall in Texas.
- 1968 – a Category 1 hurricane that made landfall in Cuba and then in Florida.
- 1979 – a very strong typhoon that re-curved east of the Philippines; also known as Barang in the Philippine Area of Responsibility (PAR).
- 1983 – a large, violent typhoon that impacted Japan as a weakening system; also known as Diding within the PAR.
- 1986 – a very strong typhoon that made landfall on Taiwan; also known as Norming within the PAR

- Abe

- 1990 – a typhoon that brought heavy rain to the Philippines and Taiwan before making landfall in China and then in North Korea; also known as Iliang in the PAR.
- 1993 – a very strong typhoon that made affected the northern Philippines and made landfall in southern China; also known as Walding within the PAR.

- Abel (1996) – a tropical depression that affected the Philippines; also known as Reming within the PAR.
- Abela (2016) – a severe tropical storm that became a remnant low as it neared the coast of Madagascar.
- Abele (2010) – a tropical cyclone in the South-West Indian Ocean that stayed away from land.
- Abigail

- 1982 – a severe tropical cyclone that looped around the Coral Sea for over two weeks.
- 2001† – a category 3 severe tropical cyclone that made landfall in Queensland, Australia.
- 2015 – an extratropical European windstorm that affected Scotland.

- Able

- 1950 – a Category 3 hurricane that made landfall in Nova Scotia as a tropical storm.
- 1951 – a Category 1 hurricane that briefly threatened the Bahamas and North Carolina.
- 1952 – a Category 2 hurricane that made landfall in South Carolina.

- Ada

- 1961 – a tropical storm that made landfall on Madagascar.
- 1970† – a severe tropical cyclone that hit the Whitsunday Region of Queensland in 1970 causing 14 fatalities.
- 2026 – a weak tropical storm that closely passed the Philippines.

- Adel

- 1993† – a severe tropical cyclone that affected Papua New Guinea.

- Adelaide (1980) – an intense tropical cyclone that capsized two ships.
- Adele

- 1966 – a Category 1 hurricane that made landfall west of Manzanillo, Colima.
- 1969 – a tropical cyclone that stayed east of Australia.
- 1970† – a Category 1 hurricane that moved over the open East Pacific Ocean.
- 1974 – a short-lived tropical disturbance that made landfall on Madagascar.

- Adeline

- 1973 – a severe tropical cyclone that formed in the Gulf of Carpentaria and made landfall in the easternmost part of the Northern Territory.
- 2005 – a severe tropical cyclone that formed near the Cocos Islands and churned in the open ocean; renamed Juliet when it moved west of 90°E.

- Adelinina (1988) – a moderate tropical storm that stayed away from land.
- Ading

- 1967 – a typhoon that weakened before making landfall on Taiwan; also known as Gilda beyond the PAR.
- 1971 – a tropical storm that formed off the coast of Luzon, and made landfall on Hainan and in Vietnam; also known as Della beyond the PAR.
- 1979 – a tropical storm that made landfall on Luzon; also known as Wayne beyond the PAR.
- 1983 – a tropical storm that dissipated at sea east of the Philippines; also known as Ruth beyond the PAR.

- Adjali (2014) – a tropical storm that passed southwest of Diego Garcia.
- Adolph

- 1983 – a Category 2 hurricane that made landfall near Puerto Vallarta and then near Mazatlán as a tropical storm.
- 1989 – a tropical storm that stayed over the open East Pacific Ocean.
- 1995 – a Category 4 hurricane that approached the coast of Southwestern Mexican but turned away.
- 2001† – a Category 4 hurricane that threatened the coast of southern Mexico before turning out to sea.

- Adrian

- 1981 – a tropical storm that dissipated before reaching the coast of Southern Mexico.
- 1987 – a tropical storm that looped off the coast of Southwestern Mexico.
- 1993 – a Category 1 hurricane that remained over the open East Pacific Ocean.
- 1999 – a Category 2 hurricane that paralleled the coast of Southwestern Mexico.
- 2005 – briefly became a Category 1 hurricane before making landfall in Central America.
- 2011 – a Category 4 hurricane that paralleled the coast of Southwestern Mexico.
- 2017 – a short-lived tropical storm that remained offshore of Southern Mexico.
- 2023 – a Category 2 hurricane that remained in the open ocean.

- Aere

- 2004 – a category 2 typhoon that affected Taiwan and Eastern China; also known as Marce within the PAR.
- 2011 – a tropical storm that affected the Philippines; also known as Bebeng within the PAR.
- 2016 – a tropical storm that made landfall in Central Vietnam and affected the Philippines, Taiwan, and China; also known as Julian within the PAR.
- 2022 – a tropical storm that struck Japan as a tropical depression; also known as Domeng within the PAR.

- Agatha

- 1967 – a short-lived tropical storm that stayed well away from land.
- 1971 – a Category 2 hurricane that made landfall in Michoacán, causing moderate damage.
- 1972† – a severe tropical cyclone that traversed the Cook Islands.
- 1975 – a Category 1 hurricane, moved northwest off the Mexican coast.
- 1980 – a Category 3 hurricane that stayed well out to sea.
- 1986 – a Category 1 hurricane that paralleled the Mexican coastline, causing heavy rain.
- 1992 – approached but did not reach the Mexican coast; caused 10 deaths in Mexico.
- 1998 – a tropical storm that moved out to sea.
- 2004 – a short-lived storm that remained southwest of Mexico.
- 2010 – brought catastrophic flooding to Central America, killing 204 (mostly in Guatemala) and causing nearly $1.1 billion (2010 USD) in damage.
- 2016 – a tropical storm that stayed over the open ocean.
- 2022 – a Category 2 hurricane that made landfall in Oaxaca.

- Agathe (1976) – a tropical storm that stayed over the open ocean.
- Agaton

- 2002 – a weak tropical storm that struck the Philippines; also known as Tapah beyond the PAR.
- 2006 – a depression that weakened as it crossed over northern Samar and southern Luzon.
- 2010 – a storm that did not make landfall; also known as Omais beyond the PAR.
- 2014 – a weak but deadly storm that affected the Philippines; also known as Lingling beyond the PAR.
- 2018 – a storm that affected southern parts of the Philippines; also known as Bolaven beyond the PAR.
- 2022† – a weak storm that affected much of eastern Visayas; also known as Megi beyond the PAR.

- Aggie (1971) – a Category 2 tropical cyclone that formed in the Gulf of Carpentaria and affected Arnhem Land in Northern Territory.
- Aghon (2024)† – a fairly strong tropical cyclone that impacted parts of the Philippines; also known as Ewiniar beyond the PAR.
- Agi (1988) † – a tropical cyclone that affected Papua New Guinea and New Caledonia.
- Agnes

- 1948 – a Category 2 typhoon that struck Japan.
- 1952 – a Category 5 super typhoon that did not affect land.
- 1957 – a Category 4 super typhoon that passed over the Ryukyu Islands at peak strength before making landfall in South Korea as a tropical storm.
- 1960 – a tropical storm that passed over Taiwan.
- 1963 – a Category 2 typhoon that struck northern Luzon in the Philippines, then crossed the South China Sea and made a second landfall in China; also known as Ising within the PAR.
- 1965 – a tropical storm that formed in the South China Sea and made landfall in Guangdong, China.
- 1968 – a Category 5 super typhoon that did not approach land.
- 1971 (September) – a Category 1 typhoon that made landfall on Taiwan; also known as Warling within the PAR.
- 1971 (December) – a long-lived storm that made landfall in Madagascar twice and also brought rain to Réunion.
- 1972† – a Category 1 hurricane that made landfall on the Florida Panhandle and affected much of the East Coast of the United States as well as Cuba and Canada, causing 128 deaths and $2.1 billion (1972 USD) in damage.
- 1974 – a Category 3 typhoon that stayed well clear of land.
- 1978 – a tropical storm in the South China Sea that killed three in Hong Kong before striking China.
- 1981 – a Category 2 typhoon that caused severe flooding in Taiwan, East China, and South Korea, leaving 159 dead or missing and at least $135 million (1981 USD) in damage; also known as Pining within the PAR.
- 1984 – a Category 4 typhoon that killed 895 people in the Philippines and another 134 in Vietnam; also known as Undang within the PAR.
- 1988 – a severe tropical storm that formed near Iwo Jima, but otherwise did not affect land
- 1995 † – a Category 4 severe tropical cyclone that meandered in the Coral Sea.

- Agni (2004) – a tropical cyclone of the 2004, known for its record proximity to the equator, had little impact on Somalia.
- Agnielle (1995) – an intense tropical cyclone, JTWC estimated second highest 1-minute winds in the Indian Ocean.
- Agueda (2026) – a strong severe tropical storm that affected Seychelles.
- Aila (2009) – a strong tropical cyclone that formed in the Bay of Bengal and caused extensive damage, as well as over 300 deaths, across Bangladesh and India.
- Aivu (1989)† – a severe tropical cyclone that caused extensive damage across parts of Queensland.
- Aka (1990) – a tropical storm that formed in the central part of the northern part of the Pacific Ocean approached Johnston Island; no damage was recorded.
- Akang

- 1982 – a severe tropical storm that made landfall on Mindanao and later along the South Central Coast of Vietnam; also known as Mamie beyond the PAR.
- 1986 – a strong typhoon that remained east of the Philippines; also known as Judy beyond the PAR.
- 1990 – a severe tropical storm that traversed the Philippines as a disturbance before striking Hainan Island and causing flooding in Guangdong Province, China; also known as Nathan beyond the PAR.
- 1994 – a tropical depression that was only recognized by PAGASA and JTWC.
- 1998 – a tropical depression that was only recognized by PAGASA and JTWC.

- Akará (2024) – formed in the South Atlantic meandered off the coast of Brazil.
- Akash (2007) – a tropical cyclone that formed over the Bay of Bengal; brought strong winds, heavy rainfall and storm surges, causing considerable damage; and struck Bangladesh, after which it weakened rapidly.
- Akoni

- 1982 – a storm that remained over the open Central Pacific.
- 2019 – a weak Central Pacific storm that did not threaten land.

- Akvan (2026) – a tropical cyclone that made landfall in the East India as tropical depression.
- Alan

- 1976 – a Category 1 tropical cyclone that affected the Queensland.
- 1998 – was considered to be one of the worst natural disasters experienced in French Polynesia.

- Albertine (1994) – an intense tropical cyclone that brushed Diego Garcia.
- Alberto

- 1982 – a Category 1 hurricane that formed near Cuba, where it caused 23 deaths due to heavy flooding.
- 1988 – a weak storm that parallelled the eastern coast of the United States and crossed the Canadian Maritimes.
- 1994 – a strong tropical storm that made landfall in Florida and continued over Georgia and Alabama, resulting in 30 deaths and causing significant damage from flooding.
- 2000 – a long-lived Category 3 hurricane that did not approach land.
- 2006 – a near-hurricane strength storm that made landfall in the Big Bend area of Florida.
- 2012 – a tropical storm that formed and remained of shore of the Carolinas.
- 2018 – a damaging storm that caused $125 million in damage to the Gulf Coast of the United States.
- 2024 – made landfall in Tamaulipas causing localized flooding in parts of northeastern Mexico and into Texas and Louisiana.

- Albine (1979) – an intense tropical cyclone that did not significantly impact land.
- Alby (1978)† – a severe tropical cyclone that was regarded as the most devastating tropical cyclone to impact southwestern Western Australia on record.
- Alcide (2018) – an intense tropical cyclone that passed just northeast of Madagascar.
- Alda (1999) – a severe tropical cyclone that did not cause significant damage.
- Aldonça (2004) – an unofficial name for Hurricane Catarina.
- Alenga (2011) – a system that became a Category 3 severe tropical cyclone South-East Indian Ocean.
- Alessia (2013) – a tropical cyclone that affected Australia's Northern Territory.
- Aletta

- 1974 – a tropical storm that made landfall in southwestern Mexico.
- 1978 – a Category 1 hurricane that made landfall near Zihuatanejo, Guerrero.
- 1982 – a storm that moved erratically off the coast of southern Mexico.
- 1988 – a tropical storm that approached the Acapulco area of the Mexican coast, it did not make landfall.
- 1994 – a tropical storm that remained far from land.
- 2000 – a Category 2 hurricane that stayed far from the coast of southwestern Mexico.
- 2006 – a tropical storm that brushed the coast of southwestern Mexico.
- 2012 – a tropical storm that remained far out to sea.
- 2018 – a Category 4 hurricane that rapidly intensified from a tropical storm to Category 4 strength in 24 hours far off the coast of southwestern Mexico.
- 2024 – formed and remained in the open ocean.

- Alex

- 1980 – a short-lived tropical storm that formed to the north of Iwo Jima.
- 1981 – a Category 2 cyclone in the southern Indian Ocean that stayed well out to sea and did not approach any land.
- 1984 – a Category 1 typhoon that passed north over Taiwan before dissipating over South Korea.
- 1987 – a minimal typhoon that brushed north Taiwan before striking mainland China; caused little damage from the typhoon, but its remnants contributed to some significant flooding in Korea.
- 1990 – a Category 5 cyclone (on the Australian scale) that formed in the Timor Sea and moved to the southwest without approaching land.
- 1998 (July) – a weak storm that never affected land in the Atlantic Ocean.
- 1998 (October) – a weak tropical storm that formed to the east of the Philippines before it was absorbed by the more powerful Typhoon Zeb; Japan Meteorological Agency analyzed it as a tropical depression, not as a tropical storm.
- 2001 – a tropical storm that formed to the north of the Cocos (Keeling) Islands before passing west of 90°E, when it was renamed Andre.
- 2004 – a Category 2 hurricane that came within 10 miles (16 km) of the Outer Banks of North Carolina, then strengthened to Category 3 once clear of land.
- 2010 – a Category 2 hurricane that made landfall in Belize as a tropical storm and passed over the Yucatán Peninsula before making landfall in Tamaulipas, Mexico, at maximum intensity.
- 2016 – a rare Category 1 hurricane that formed in mid-January, made landfall in the Azores causing heavy rainfall and gusty winds.
- 2022 – a short-lived tropical storm that produced heavy rainfall in the Yucatán Peninsula, western Cuba and South Florida while developing.

- Alexandra (1991) – a severe tropical storm that did not significantly affect land.
- Alexina (1993) – a moderate tropical storm that did not significantly affect land.
- Alfa (1973) – weak subtropical storm that paralleled the East Coast of the United States.
- Alfred

- 1986 – a Category 1 tropical cyclone that stayed at sea for most of its lifetime.
- 2017 – a Category 2 tropical cyclone that formed in the Gulf of Carpentaria, briefly affecting land.
- 2025† – a Category 4 tropical cyclone that caused severe damage to south-east Queensland and the north coast of New South Wales.

- Alibera (1989) – a tropical cyclone that crossed Madagascar, causing 46 deaths.
- Alice

- 1947 – a Category 4 typhoon that did not approach land.
- 1953 (May) – a strong tropical storm that caused a few deaths in Cuba.
- 1953 (October) – a long-lived Category 3 typhoon which did not affect land; crossed the International Date Line before dissipating.
- 1954 (June) – a Category 1 hurricane that killed 55 in Mexico.
- 1954 (December) – the latest Atlantic hurricane ever known to form and only one of two Atlantic storms known to exist in 2 calendar years; originally named as a 1955 storm; caused minimal damage in the Lesser Antilles.
- 1958 – a Category 4 typhoon that affected Japan; responsible for over 40 deaths on Hokkaidō.
- 1961 – a Category 1 typhoon that formed in the South China Sea before making landfall near Hong Kong, killing four people there.
- 1964 – a short-lived Category 1 typhoon to the east of the Philippines.
- 1966 – a Category 4 typhoon that made landfall in eastern China.
- 1969 – a tropical storm that affected southern Japan.
- 1972 – a Category 2 typhoon that passed close to Japan's Boso Peninsula
- 1973 (July) – a Category 1 hurricane which affected Bermuda and eastern Canada.
- 1973 (September) – a long-lived cyclone that passed through the southern Seychelles.
- 1974 – stayed well east of the coast of New South Wales and Queensland.
- 1975 – a Category 1 typhoon that passed over Luzon in the Philippines and the Chinese island of Hainan.
- 1976 – formed in the Timor Sea and moved west over the open ocean.
- 1979 – a Category 3 typhoon that caused severe damage in the Marshall Islands.
- 1980 – a Category 3 tropical cyclone that formed near Sumatra and moved out into the open sea; renamed Adelaide when it crossed into the South-West Indian Ocean basin.

- Alicia

- 1983† – a Category 3 hurricane that struck Galveston, Texas.
- 2020 – a tropical cyclone that did not affect any land.

- Alifredy (1985) – a tropical depression that crossed Madagascar with minimal impacts.
- Aline (1969) – a powerful tropical storm passed off the coast of Madagascar.
- Alinina (1987) – a severe tropical storm that did not significantly impact land.
- Alison

- 1975† – formed near New Caledonia and moved south towards South Island, New Zealand.
- 1986 – formed in the Timor Sea near Christmas Island before moving west; was renamed Krisostoma when it passed over 90°E.
- 1991 – formed in the central Indian Ocean, well away from land.
- 1998 – formed near the Cocos (Keeling) Islands and brought minor effects to the islands.

- Alix (1960) – a Category 1 tropical cyclone that affected Mauritius.
- Allen (1980)† – a rare and extremely powerful Cape Verde hurricane that affected the Caribbean, eastern and northern Mexico, and southern Texas in August 1980.
- Allison

- 1989 – partially developed from the remnants of Hurricane Cosme from the Pacific Ocean, it brought heavy rain to the southern United States, killing 11 and causing $500 million (1989 USD) in damage.
- 1995 – a Category 1 hurricane that made landfall on the Florida Panhandle as a tropical storm; killed three and caused minor damage.
- 2001† – struck Houston, Texas, killing 41 and causing $9 billion in damages, mostly due to heavy rains and flooding.

- Allyn (1949) – a Category 4 typhoon that struck Guam and affected Japan.
- Alma

- 1946 – strong typhoon that moved east of Japan.
- 1958 – tropical storm that made landfall in northeastern Mexico.
- 1962 – struck North Carolina as a tropical storm before heading out to sea.
- 1966 – rare Atlantic major hurricane in June; killed 93, mostly in Honduras, and did $210 million damage (in 1966 dollars), mostly to Cuba.
- 1970 – one of only four May hurricanes in the Atlantic; killed seven in eastern Cuba and one in Miami.
- 1974 – struck Trinidad and Tobago and Venezuela, also caused 49 indirect deaths from a plane crash.
- 1984 – tropical storm that remained over the open Pacific Ocean.
- 1990 – earliest hurricane on record in the eastern Pacific proper (east of 140°W), did not affect land.
- 1996 – Category 2 hurricane that killed 20 in Mexico.
- 2002 – one of five Pacific major hurricanes in the month of May, never affected land.
- 2008† – easternmost forming Pacific tropical cyclone, struck Nicaragua and despite minimal impacts became one of three eastern Pacific tropical storms to have its name retired.

- Alpha

- 1972 – small subtropical storm in May that made landfall in Georgia.
- 2005 – Atlantic tropical storm that caused 26 deaths in Hispaniola.
- 2020 – a subtropical storm that formed near Portugal.

- Althea (1971)† – a severe tropical cyclone that devastated parts of North Queensland in 1971, causing two deaths.
- Alvaro (2023) – a tropical cyclone that slightly affected Mozambique made landfall on the coast of Madagascar.
- Alvin

- 2005 – strong November system in the south Indian Ocean.
- 2007 – weak tropical storm that stayed well southwest of Mexico.
- 2013 – low-latitude tropical storm that existed south of Mexico.
- 2019 – minimal hurricane that stayed west of the Baja California peninsula.
- 2025 – approached Baja California but dissipated before making landfall.

- Amanda

- 1963 – formed in the southwest Indian Ocean and stayed out to sea.
- 1965 – formed in the Arafura Sea and drifted across the Northern Territory and Western Australia.
- 2014 – a Category 4 hurricane that became the strongest Eastern Pacific hurricane in the month of May.
- 2020 – a short-lived tropical storm that made landfall in southeastern Guatemala. Its remnants spawned Tropical Storm Cristobal in the Gulf of Mexico.
- 2026 – weak tropical storm, formed in the open ocean.

- Amang

- 2003 – a long-lived tropical cyclone that lasted for 16 days affected the island nations of Micronesia, Taiwan, and Japan in April 2003, as well as the earliest typhoon in a calendar year to ever make landfall on the latter.
- 2007 – an early super typhoon of the season.
- 2011 – remained over the open ocean.
- 2015 – an early-season tropical cyclone that made landfall over the Philippines in January 2015.
- 2019 – tropical depression indirectly triggered landslides and flash floods in Davao Oriental and Agusan del Norte, killing 10 people.
- 2023 – a weak tropical depression made landfall Philippines caused minimal damage.

- Amara (2013) – brought flooding rain and gusty winds to the island of Rodrigues.
- Ambali (2019) – powerful yet short-lived cyclone in the southwest Indian Ocean.
- Amber

- 1968 – formed to the west of the Cocos (Keeling) Islands and did not approach land.
- 1997 – a Category 3 typhoon that hit Taiwan and then mainland China.

- Ambo

- 2004 – was only recognized by PAGASA.
- 2008 – earliest storm on record to strike China.
- 2012 – brought torrential rainfall to the Bicol Region, leaving three people dead.
- 2016 – was only recognized by PAGASA and the JTWC.
- 2020† – powerful typhoon that hit the Philippines during the COVID-19 outbreak, causing over ₱1 billion in damages.

- Amelia

- 1975 – tropical storm that formed in the Arafura Sea and soon moved inland over Australia's Northern Territory.
- 1978 – formed at the extreme western end of the Gulf of Mexico; caused catastrophic flooding in Texas that resulted in 33 deaths and $110 million (1978 USD) in damage.
- 1981 – meandered across the Gulf of Carpentaria and the Northern Territory before dissipating over the Timor Sea.

- Ami (2003)† – made landfall on Vanua Levu before subsequently crossing the western tip of Taveuni and then traversing the Lau Group.
- Amos (2016) – a strong tropical cyclone that affected the Fijian and Samoan Islands as well as Wallis and Futuna.
- Amphan (2020) – a powerful and catastrophic tropical cyclone that caused widespread damage in Eastern India, specifically in West Bengal and Odisha, and in Bangladesh, in May 2020.
- Ampil

- 2018 – a tropical cyclone that caused moderate damage in the Ryukyu Islands and East and Northeast China.
- 2024 – a high-latitude Category 4 typhoon that skirted Eastern Japan.

- Amy

- 1951 – struck the Central Philippines as a Category 4 typhoon.
- 1956 – did not affect land.
- 1959 – struck Japan.
- 1962 (August) – first made landfall in Taiwan as a Category 4 super typhoon, then in China as a typhoon; moved out into the South China Sea, and finally made landfall in South Korea as a tropical storm.
- 1962 (October) – passed near Rodrigues and brushed St. Brandon.
- 1965 – brushed Japan.
- 1967 – remained over the open ocean.
- 1968 – existed over the central Indian Ocean.
- 1971 – traversed the Caroline Islands as a Category 5-equivalent super typhoon.
- 1974 – existed in March 1974.
- 1975 – neared the coast of North Carolina before turning out to sea.
- 1977 – hit Taiwan.
- 1980 – struck Western Australia as a Category 5 cyclone.
- 1991 – a Category 4 typhoon that brushed southern Taiwan and then made landfall in southern China.
- 1994 – made landfall in Vietnam.

- Ana

- 1979 – formed east of the Lesser Antilles and crossed Leeward Islands.
- 1985 – rounded Bermuda, neared Newfoundland, but dissipated before striking.
- 1991 – paralleled the East Coast of the United States.
- 1997 – wobbled off the Carolinas.
- 2003 – the first recorded Atlantic storm to form in April.
- 2009 – a weak tropical storm that crossed the Leeward Islands and dissipated near Puerto Rico.
- 2014 – the longest-lived hurricane in the central Pacific basin, bringing heavy rain to the Hawaiian Islands.
- 2015 – the earliest storm to make landfall in the United States during the calendar year.
- 2021 (January) † – brought flooding to portions of Fiji.
- 2021 (May) – pre-season storm in the Atlantic that churned in the open ocean.
- 2022 – crossed northern Madagascar, causing severe flooding, and then made landfall in Mozambique.

- Anacelle (1998) – a tropical cyclone that did not significantly impact land.
- Anais (2012) – strong preseason storm that was the earliest Intense Tropical Cyclone in the southwest Indian Ocean.
- Ancha (2024) – formed in the central Indian Ocean, remained at sea.
- Anding

- 1965 – did not affect land.
- 1981 – super typhoon that struck the Philippines, causing $63.3 million in damage, and 595 deaths.
- 1993 – struck China a week after Typhoon Becky.

- Ando (2000) – an intense tropical cyclone that caused 2 deaths.
- Andre (2001) – a severe tropical storm that was renamed from Alex, did not significantly affect land.
- Andrea

- 1970 – crossed into 80 degrees East and stayed out to sea, causing no impact to land
- 2007 – formed near Florida, brought rain to portions of the Southeast United States.
- 2013 – tropical storm that made landfall in Florida, killing three people.
- 2019 – weak subtropical storm that meandered over the Western Atlantic.
- 2025 – weak and short-lived storm over the central Atlantic.

- Andree (1970) – a tropical disturbance passed off the coast of Madagascar.
- Andres

- 1979 – made landfall in Mexico as a tropical depression.
- 1985 – stayed out to sea.
- 1991 – stayed out to sea.
- 1997 – one of two storms to make landfall in El Salvador.
- 2003 – tropical storm that remained at sea.
- 2009 – minimal hurricane that was parallel to the coast of Mexico; killed three people directly and two people indirectly.
- 2015 – major hurricane that stayed well at sea.
- 2021 – earliest tropical storm to form in the Eastern Pacific.

- Andrew

- 1986 – which paralleled the southeastern United States.
- 1992† – one of only three Category 5 hurricanes to strike the United States, it hit Homestead, Florida and left $27.3 billion in damage.

- Andry (1983) – an intense tropical cyclone that badly affected the Agaléga islands and made landfall on Madagascar.
- Andy

- 1982 – struck Taiwan and China.
- 1985 – struck Vietnam.
- 1989 – passed to the southeast of Guam in the mid-Pacific.

- Anety (1984) – a moderate tropical storm that affected Mozambique and Madagascar with minimal impacts.
- Angela

- 1867 – killed 1,800 people in the Philippines.
- 1966 – moderate tropical storm that remained northeast of Madagascar.
- 1972 – short-lived tropical storm that stayed south of Indonesia.
- 1989 – very strong typhoon that brushed the Philippines, causing 119 deaths and $8 million (1989 USD) in damage.
- 1992 – made landfall in Vietnam as a tropical storm after spending several days in the South China Sea.
- 1995† – powerful and catastrophic typhoon that killed over 900 in the Philippines and nearly ₱11 billion in damage.

- Angele (1978) – a Category 3 tropical cyclone that made landfall Mozambique and Madagascar.
- Anggrek

- 2010 – off-season tropical low that affected the Cocos Islands.
- 2024 – a Category 4 tropical cyclone that churned in the open ocean.

- Angola (1991) – a weak tropical storm is the only tropical cyclone on record in the eastern South Atlantic.
- Anika

- 2008 – dissipated northwest of Australia.
- 2022 – a Category 2 tropical cyclone that made landfall twice on Western Australia.

- Aning

- 1966 – Category 2 typhoon.
- 1970 – a tropical storm south of the Mekong Delta, but it weakened into a tropical depression before it crossed just south of Cape Cà Mau.
- 1974 – Category 4 typhoon.
- 1978 – Category 2 typhoon.
- 1982 – crossed the Marshall Islands as a Category 3 typhoon, Guam as a tropical storm, then restrengthened to a typhoon before crossing the Philippines.
- 1986 – crossed the southern Philippines as a Category 2 typhoon, then dissipated in the South China Sea.
- 1994 – struck Japan.

- Anita

- 1955 – moderately strong typhoon that moved out to sea.
- 1959 – was not recognized by the Japan Meteorological Agency.
- 1961 – was not recognized by the Japan Meteorological Agency.
- 1964 – struck Vietnam as a tropical storm.
- 1967 (June) – brushed Luzon before moving ashore in Guangdong.
- 1967 (October) – a weak tropical storm formed in the south-western Indian Ocean.
- 1970 – super typhoon which struck Japan, causing several deaths.
- 1973 – entered the Gulf of Tonkin and made landfall in Vietnam as a typhoon.
- 1976 – low-end typhoon that hit Japan as a tropical storm.
- 1977† – Category 5 Atlantic hurricane, made landfall at peak intensity in Tamaulipas and killed 11 people.
- 2006 – tropical storm that passed between the African mainland and Madagascar.
- 2010 – rare South Atlantic tropical cyclone.

- Anja (2009) – intense tropical cyclone, stayed away from Diego Garcia and Rodrigues.
- Ann

- 1945 – first system of the 1945 Pacific typhoon season.
- 1996 – weak tropical storm that struck the Philippines in April.
- 1999 – looped across the Yellow Sea, bringing rain to East China, South Korea, and southwestern Japan.
- 2019 – brought minor impacts to Far North Queensland as a weakening tropical low.

- Anna

- 1947 – minimal tropical storm that hit Mindanao.
- 1956 – Category 1 hurricane that made landfall south of Tampico, Mexico.
- 1960 – a weak tropical storm that remained far out to sea.
- 1961 – passed through the Caribbean Sea as a Category 2 hurricane, caused one death and moderate damage in Central America.
- 1965 – existed over the open Atlantic Ocean.
- 1969 – long-lasting tropical storm that tracked from the tropical Atlantic to south of Nova Scotia.
- 1976 – looped over the Azores as an extratropical system.

- Annabelle (2015) – severe tropical storm that passed near Diego Garcia.
- Anne

- 1965 – a tropical disturbance that remained far out to sea.
- 1977 – A Category 2 tropical cyclone passed south-westwards through the Fijian Islands.
- 1988† – Category 4 severe tropical cyclone (on the Australian scale) that impacted the Solomon Islands, Tuvalu, northern Vanuatu and New Caledonia.

- Annette

- 1960 – tropical storm that passed south of Mexico.
- 1968 – short-lived tropical storm that made landfall on Mexico.
- 1972 – a Category 1 hurricane that made landfall on Mexico as a tropical storm.
- 1976 – a Category 4 hurricane that stayed out to sea.
- 1994† – severe tropical cyclone that made landfall southwest of Broome.

- Annie

- 1967 – did not affect land.
- 1968 – existed in October and November 1968.
- 1973 – existed northwest of Western Australia.

- Anthony (2011) – made landfall on the Queensland coast, causing minor damage.
- Antoinette (1996) – a severe tropical storm that did not significantly affect land.
- Apiang (1988) – a fast-moving tropical storm that stopped abruptly near the Philippines.
- Apollo (2021) – a rare Mediterranean tropical-like cyclone.
- Arani (2011) – a rare South Atlantic subtropical storm.
- Ariane (1972) – a strong severe tropical storm passed north of Mauritius.
- Ariel (2007) – originally named Lee in the Australian region, but crossed into the South-West Indian Ocean and was renamed Ariel.
- Arilisy (1982) – a tropical depression that did not significantly impact land.
- Aring

- 1964 – struck the Philippines and China.
- 1976 – made landfall on Philippines.
- 1980 – made landfall on Luzon, caused 81 fatalities.
- 1984 – did not make landfall.

- Ariny (1987) – a severe tropical storm that stayed away from land.
- Arlene

- 1959 – a tropical storm which brought flooding to Louisiana, killing one person.
- 1963 – a Category 2 hurricane which passed over Bermuda, only causing light damage.
- 1967 – a Category 1 hurricane in the central Atlantic Ocean which did not affect land.
- 1971 – a tropical storm that moved parallel to the east coast of the United States without making landfall.
- 1981 – a tropical storm that crossed Cuba and the Bahamas, with only minimal effects.
- 1987 – a Category 1 hurricane that spent much of its life as a tropical storm far from land.
- 1993 – a tropical storm that brought heavy rain to Mexico and Texas; killed 29 people.
- 1999 – a tropical storm that drifted past the east of Bermuda.
- 2005 – large tropical storm that made landfall in the Florida Panhandle; its remnants contributed to major flooding in upstate New York.
- 2011 – a strong tropical storm that made landfall on Mexico, killing at least 25 people along its path.
- 2017 – the first April named storm in the Atlantic since Ana of 2003, as well as the strongest storm in April, a very rare occurrence.
- 2023 – a short-lived tropical storm in the Gulf of Mexico.

- Arlette (1964) – a tropical disturbance that did not affect land.
- Armelle (1981) – a severe tropical storm that did not significantly affect land.
- Arnab (2026) – a Category 4 tropical cyclone that affected South and East India.
- Arola (2004) – a severe tropical storm that did not significantly affect land.
- Arthur

- 1981 – did not affect land.
- 1984 – formed on August 28, very late for the first storm; moved over Newfoundland as an extratropical storm; no damages or casualties.
- 1990 – formed in the Caribbean, strengthened to near hurricane-strength, and dissipated.
- 1991 – Arthur formed from the remnants of Wasa, but was renamed.
- 1996 – struck North Carolina as a weak tropical storm.
- 2002 – weak tropical storm that did not significantly affect land.
- 2007 – formed in late January in the south Pacific Ocean briefly threatening the Cook.
- 2008 – formed quickly just before moving inland in Belize on May 31.
- 2014 – a Category 2 hurricane that formed on July 1 near the northwestern Bahamas, struck North Carolina a few days later producing minimal damage.
- 2020 – pre-season storm which neared North Carolina but moved out to sea before affecting Bermuda.
- 2026 – a short-lived and poorly-organized tropical storm that struck Texas.

- Asani (2022) – a strong tropical cyclone formed off the coast of Andaman and Nicobar Islands, and made landfall in India in May 2022.
- Ashley (2022) – a tropical storm that remained far out to sea.
- Asiang

- 1964 – Category 2 typhoon; did not make landfall.
- 1968 – a tropical depression that stayed in open waters
- 1972 – strong storm that killed 204 people in the Philippines and caused US$23 million in damages
- 1976 – a tropical depression only recognized by PAGASA
- 1980 – existed in February 1980
- 1984 – passed by the southern coast of Taiwan; led to flooding in Luzon; made landfall in China near the Luichow Peninsula.
- 1988 – caused widespread damage on Guam and on Rota in the Mariana Islands; at its peak, sustained winds reached 135 mph.
- 1992 – struck southeast Japan, damage reached 371.8 million yen ($2.9 million).
- 1996 – impacted the Philippines on Leap Day
- 2000 – strong Category 5 super typhoon; did not make landfall.

- Asma (2008) – a moderate tropical storm that affected Northern Madagascar, causing one fatality.
- Asna (2024) – a tropical cyclone that affected Northern India and Southern Pakistan.
- Astride (1999) – a severe tropical storm that did not cause significant damage.
- Atang

- 1966 – remained over the open ocean.
- 1970 – a Category 4 typhoon that affected Philippines.
- 1974 – a tropical storm that did not cause significant damage.
- 1978† – a powerful tropical cyclone which affected the Philippines and Taiwan.
- 2002 – passed near the north coast of Madagascar, and later moved inland in southeastern Tanzania.

- Atring

- 1965 – only recognized by PAGASA.
- 1969 – Category 3-equivalent typhoon that struck the Philippines
- 1973 – struck China.
- 1977 – existed in January 1977
- 1981 – designated as a tropical depression by PAGASA; not named as a tropical storm by the Joint Typhoon Warning Center (JTWC).
- 1985 – erratic tropical cyclone existing in January 1985
- 1989 – formed southeast of Hawaii; travelled west of the International Dateline and dissipated north of Mindanao.
- 1993 – formed near the Philippines; made landfall on Mindanao.
- 1997 – JMA analyzed it as a tropical depression, not as a tropical storm), an early-season storm that approached the Philippines, but died out before affecting land.

- Atsani

- 2015 – strong typhoon that stayed out to sea.
- 2020 – severe tropical storm that affected the Philippines and Taiwan. Also known as Siony within the PAR.
- 2026 – weak tropical storm that remained in the open ocean.

- Atu

- 1983 – a Category 1 tropical cyclone that minimal affected Vanuatu.
- 1996 – a Category 1 tropical cyclone that minimal affected New Caledonia and Vanuatu.
- 2011† – a Category 4 severe tropical cyclone that affected Vanuatu.

- Audrey

- 1957† – deadly Category 3 hurricane that severely affected Louisiana and Texas.
- 1964† – cyclone that damaged parts of north and eastern Australia.
- 1969 – existed during early March.
- 1975 – tropical storm that made landfall on Madagascar.

- Auring

- 1963 – passed Japan in June 1963 as a Category 1-equivalent typhoon.
- 1967 – existed in January and February 1967.
- 1971 – existed in January 1971.
- 1975 – struck the Philippines.
- 1979 – stayed out to sea.
- 1983 – struck the Philippines and China.
- 1987 – extensive damage on Ulithi Atoll but no deaths reported.
- 1991 – struck the Philippines.
- 1995 – struck the Philippines.
- 1999 – Japan Meteorological Agency analyzed it as a tropical depression, not as a tropical storm), brought heavy rain to Sabah.
- 2001 – a tropical depression that was only recognized by PAGASA and JTWC.
- 2005 – struck the Philippines.
- 2009 – a tropical depression that was recognized by the JMA and PAGASA.
- 2013 – an early forming storm which made landfall over Mindanao and Palawan.
- 2017 – struck the Philippines.
- 2021 – a tropical storm which caused heavy rain in the Philippines and Palau, leading to minor damage.
- 2025 – a tropical depression minimal affected Philippines and Taiwan.

- Aurore (1977) – a Category 4 tropical cyclone that stayed out to sea.
- Ava

- 1962 – tropical storm that stayed off the Mexican Pacific coast.
- 1965 – tropical storm that never affected land.
- 1969 – latest first named storm in the East Pacific basin.
- 1973 – earliest-forming Category 5 hurricane in the East Pacific basin.
- 1977 – tropical storm that stayed out to sea.
- 2018 – made landfall in Madagascar, killing at least 51 people and leaving 54,000 homeless.

- Aviona (1992) – a moderate tropical storm that did not significantly affect land.
- Awo (2025) – a weak tropical storm that stayed out to sea.
- Axel

- 1992 – a Category 1 typhoon that caused heavy damage to several of the Marshall Islands.
- 1994 – a Category 4 typhoon which passed over the central Philippines, killing at least 12 people.

== See also ==
- European windstorm names
- Atlantic hurricane season
- List of Pacific hurricane seasons
- Tropical cyclone naming
- South Atlantic tropical cyclone
- Tropical cyclone
