= Ading =

Ading may refer to:

- Ading Fernando Lifetime Achievement Award - Television award
- Simon Adingra - Ivorian footballer
- Lazare Adingono - Cameroonian-American basketball player
- Adingningon - Arrondissement in Benin
- List of storms named Ading - 4 storms with the same name
