= Anika (disambiguation) =

Anika is a feminine given name.

Anika may also refer to:

- Anika (musician), (born 1987), British-German singer and journalist
  - Anika (album)
- Cyclone Anika, two tropical cyclones
- Jerlin Anika (born 2004), Indian deaf badminton player

== See also ==
- Annika, listing people, characters and TV shows
- Anikha Surendran, Indian actress
