= Anding =

Anding may refer to:

== Places ==
=== China ===
==== Districts and counties (安定区) ====
- Anding District, Dingxi, Gansu, formerly Anding County
- Zichang County, formerly Anding County

==== Towns (安定镇) ====
- Anding, Beijing, in Daxing District, Beijing
- Anding, Pingjiang, subdivision of Pingjiang County, Hunan
- Anding, Jilin, subdivision of Taonan, Jilin
- Anding, Shaanxi, subdivision of Zichang County, Shaanxi
- Anding, Yunnan, subdivision of Jingdong Yi Autonomous County, Yunnan

==== Historical ====
- Anding Commandery, commandery in Gansu and Ningxia

=== Taiwan ===
- Anding District, Tainan (安定區)

=== Elsewhere ===
- Anding, Mississippi, an unincorporated community in Yazoo County, Mississippi, US

== People with the surname ==
- Carola Anding (born 1960), former East German cross country skier
- Charles Anding (1928–2004), American labor leader and politician
- Don Anding (born 1991), American soccer player
- Princess Anding, also known as Princess Taihe, princess of the Chinese dynasty Tang Dynasty

== Other uses ==
- "Anding", a 2022 song by CSR
- Logical conjunction, or and, two-place logical operation used in logic and mathematics
- Typhoon Anding (disambiguation), several typhoons
