= Aring =

Aring may refer to:

- Aring Bautista (1920s—?), a Filipino actress
- Typhoon Aring (disambiguation)
- The letter Å
