= List of storms named Alan =

The name Alan has been used for two tropical cyclones worldwide: one in the Australian region and one in the South Pacific Ocean.

In the Australian Region:

- Cyclone Alan (1976) – a Category 1 tropical cyclone that affected Queensland.

In the South Pacific Ocean:

- Cyclone Alan (1998) – was considered to be one of the worst natural disasters experienced in French Polynesia.

== See also ==
- Hurricane Allen (1980) – a similar name that was used once in the Atlantic Ocean.
