= List of storms named Abe =

The name Abe has been used for two tropical cyclones in the West Pacific Ocean:

- Typhoon Abe (1990) – a Category 2 typhoon that brought heavy rain to the Philippines and Taiwan before making landfall in China
- Typhoon Abe (1993) – a Category 3 typhoon that made landfall in southern China

== See also ==
- Tropical Depression Abel (1996) – a West Pacific tropical cyclone with a similar name
