= Tropical Depression Amang (2019) =

Pacific tropical depression in 2019

Tropical Depression 01W (Amang)
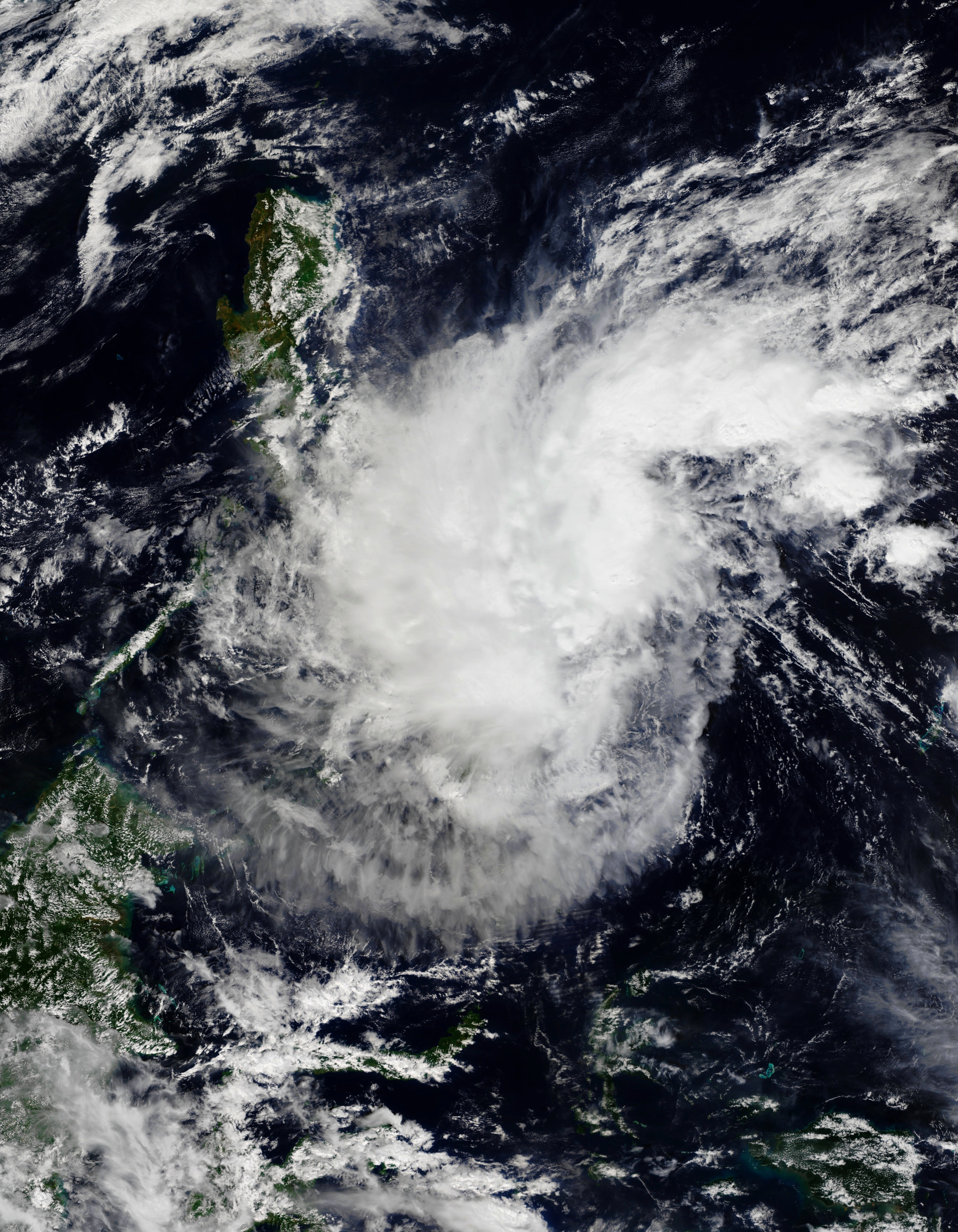
- Tropical Depression Amang east of Mindanao on January 20

Meteorological history
- Formed: January 4, 2019
- Dissipated: January 22, 2019

Tropical depression
- 10-minute sustained (JMA)
- Highest winds: 55 km/h (35 mph)
- Lowest pressure: 1004 hPa (mbar); 29.65 inHg

Tropical depression
- 1-minute sustained (SSHWS/JTWC)
- Highest winds: 55 km/h (35 mph)
- Lowest pressure: 1003 hPa (mbar); 29.62 inHg

Overall effects
- Fatalities: 11 total
- Damage: $580,000 (2019 USD)
- Areas affected: Kiribati, Marshall Islands, Caroline Islands, Philippines
- IBTrACS /
- Part of the 2019 Pacific typhoon season

Tropical Depression Amang was a weak but long-lived tropical cyclone which triggered flash floods and landslides over the southeastern Philippines in January 2019. Forming as a tropical depression northeast of the Gilbert Islands on January 4, the depression moved slowly to the north, but weakened to a low-pressure area two days later. The remnants turned westward and crossed the open Pacific Ocean. Despite favourable environment, the system failed to re-develop. It attained tropical depression status again on January 19, just east of Mindanao. Amang turned north-northwest and passed just east of Siargao Island on the next day. Amang dissipated on January 22 to the northeast of Samar.

Amang brushed the eastern Mindanao, the Eastern Visayas and the Bicol Region, while some regions were still recovered from impacts brought by Usman last month. Therefore, authorities stayed alert and mandatory evacuations were performed. Heavy rainfall felt in eastern Mindanao and Samar. Eight people were killed directly by Amang, including seven due to a landslide in Agusan del Norte. Amang interacted with a cold front and brought heavy rains in Davao Oriental, which triggered flash floods and landslides in the province. Three people were killed and over 106,000 people were affected. Damage was amounted to ₱30.5 million (US$580,000).

== Meteorological history ==
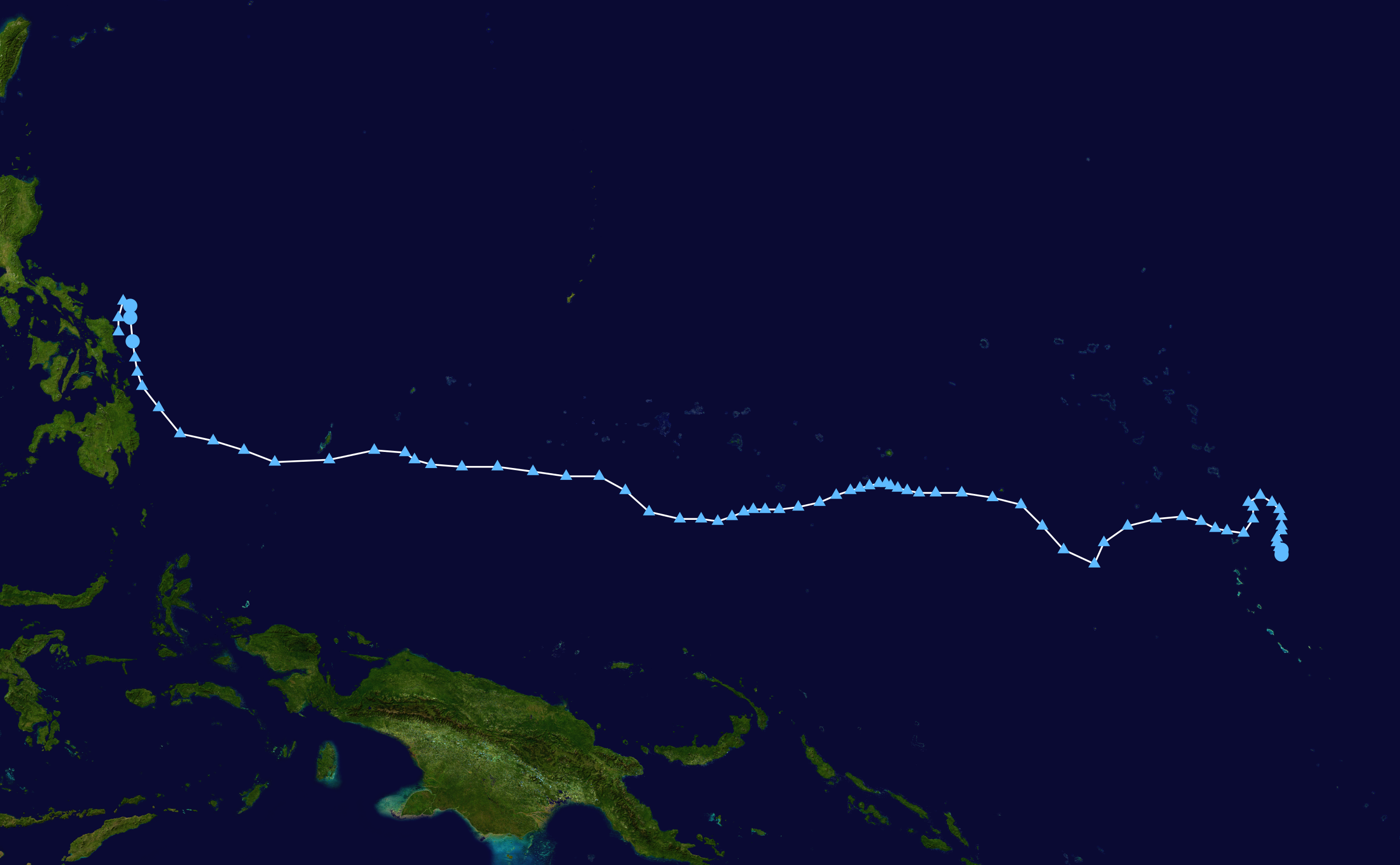
Map plotting the storm's track and intensity, according to the Saffir–Simpson scale Map key Saffir–Simpson scale Tropical depression (≤38 mph, ≤62 km/h) Tropical storm (39–73 mph, 63–118 km/h) Category 1 (74–95 mph, 119–153 km/h) Category 2 (96–110 mph, 154–177 km/h) Category 3 (111–129 mph, 178–208 km/h) Category 4 (130–156 mph, 209–251 km/h) Category 5 (≥157 mph, ≥252 km/h) Unknown Storm type Tropical cyclone Subtropical cyclone Extratropical cyclone, remnant low, tropical disturbance, or monsoon depression

The origin of Amang can be traced back to January 3, as an area of convection about 530 km (330 mi) southeast of Kwajalein Atoll. The center was broad, asymmetrical, and poorly defined. Despite that, low wind shear, good poleward outflow, and high sea surface temperature of 28–30 °C (82–86 °F) favoured potential tropical cyclogenesis. On the next day, deep convection persisted over the northern part of the center while moving slowly to the north, which led to the issuance of Tropical Cyclone Formation Alert (TCFA) from the Joint Typhoon Warning Center (JTWC). Later that day, the JTWC designated the system as Tropical Depression 01W. However, the convection was limited and the center cannot be identified, so the JTWC issued the final warning to the system on January 6. Although some scattered deep convection burst, the center remained disorganized, and the tropical cyclone forecast models predicted that the system was unlikely to re-develop in days while it turned westward.

Within the next ten days, despite situating in warm waters of 28–30 °C (82–86 °F), low wind shear and strong diffluence, only scattered convection persisted over an ill-defined center, which made the re-development became unlikely. On January 18, the JTWC issued a TCFA again, as the center became well-defined, and deep convection burst over the western part of it. On January 19, the TCFA was cancelled, as the center was elongated and became partly exposed due to increasing wind shear. Nevertheless, the Japan Meteorological Agency (JMA) upgraded it to a tropical depression. Later that day, the PAGASA classified it as a tropical depression and assigned the local name Amang. Amang turned north-northwest on the next day and made landfall over the Siargao Island at 20:00 PST (12:00 UTC). It made another landfall in Salcedo, Eastern Samar at 07:30 PST January 21 (23:30 UTC January 20). However, in the post-season analysis, the PAGASA revealed that the center of Amang actually remained offshore and never made landfall. The convection weakened and the center was completely exposed on January 22, due to increasing wind shear. Both JMA and the JTWC ceased monitoring the system on that day, while the PAGASA downgraded it to a low-pressure area.

== Preparations and impact ==
Animation depicting the issuance of TCWS in the Philippines for Amang

On January 12, while Amang was still several thousands kilometers away from the Philippines as a low-pressure area, the PAGASA noted it and stated that the stystem could interact with a trough and brought rainfall to Mindanao. As Amang approached the southern Philippines on January 19, the PAGASA issued a TCWS #1 for Agusan del Sur, Agusan del Norte, Surigao del Sur, Surigao del Norte, Dinagat Islands and Camiguin. On the next day, the TCWS #1 extended to Eastern Samar, Samar, Biliran, Leyte, Southern Leyte, eastern Bohol and northern Cebu. On January 21, the TCWS in Mindanao and Central Visayas were cancelled, while TCWS #1 were raised over Sorsogon, Masbate (including Ticao Island) and Northern Samar. All TCWS were cancelled after Amang weakened to a low-pressure area. On January 21, four domestic flights from Cebgo were cancelled due to bad weather. Sea transport between Cebu and various islands of Central Visayas were cancelled. 3.354 people were stranded in Central Visayas, Bicol Region, and Eastern Visayas. School classes in Agusan del Sur, Agusan del Norte, Surigao del Sur, Surigao del Norte, Bohol, Albay, Camarines Sur, Camarines Norte, Masbate, Sorsogon, Biliran, Leyte, Northern Samar, and Calbayog were cancelled on January 21. Classes in Albay, Camarines Sur, Camarines Norte, Sorsogon and Northern Samar were also cancelled on January 22.

Amang was expected to hit the Bicol Region, while some areas were still recovering from the impacts brought by Usman last month. Mandatory evacuations were performed across Mindanao, Eastern Visayas, and the Bicol Region. 80,234 families in vulnerable areas were forced to evacuate. Amang brought heavy rains to Mindanao and Eastern Visayas and triggered flooding and landslides. The highest 24-hour rainfall across the country was 113.9 mm (4.48 in), recorded in Hinatuan, Surigao del Sur, while part of the eastern Mindanao had a 24-hour rainfall of over 100 mm (3.9 in). A highway in Monkayo, Compostela Valley was blocked by a landslide. It also down three power poles and caused power outage in the town. In San Francisco, Southern Leyte, a boy was found dead after falling into a river. Heavy rains triggered a landslide in Mount Manhupaw, between Jabonga and Santiago, Agusan del Norte on January 20, which affected eight miner when they were treasure hunting. Four of them were dead, three were missing and another one was injured. The three missing was confirmed dead later. A total of 16,574 people were affected by Amang.

Besides, Amang interacted with a cold front and triggered flash floods and landslides in a least three towns of Davao Oriental on January 22. At least 50 houses in the province was washed away, and 750 families were displaced. 19,923 people were evacuated. The floods killed one, injured two, and left two others missing. The two missing were found dead later. The floods and landslides affected 106,475 people, destroyed 86 houses and damaged 167 others. Total damage of the floods and landslides was estimated at ₱30.5 million (US$580,000). A state of calamity was declared for Davao Oriental due to the impacts of the floods and landslides. However, some officials said that the floods and landslides in the province was caused by thunderstorms, and not directly related to Amang.

== See also ==
- Weather of 2019
- Tropical cyclones in 2019
- Tropical Storm Lingling (2014)
- Tropical Storm Sanba (2018)
- Tropical Storm Dujuan (2021)
- Tropical Storm Megi (2022)
