= List of storms named Adolph =

The name Adolph was used for four tropical cyclones in the Eastern Pacific Ocean.

- Hurricane Adolph (1983), a Category 2 hurricane that passed close to Mazatlán, Mexico.
- Tropical Storm Adolph (1989), stayed far from land.
- Hurricane Adolph (1995), Category 4 hurricane that neared the Mexican coast but turned away.
- Hurricane Adolph (2001), strong Category 4 hurricane which became the second most intense May hurricane on record in the Eastern Pacific Ocean.

The name Adolph was removed from the name list during the 2001 season due to concern that continued use of the name would be politically insensitive; it was replaced with Alvin in the 2007 season.
