= List of storms named Anna =

The name Anna has been used for seven tropical cyclones worldwide: five in the Atlantic Ocean, one in the West Pacific Ocean, and one in the South-West Indian Ocean. Anna has also been used for one European windstorm.

In the Atlantic:

- Hurricane Anna (1956) – a Category 1 hurricane that made landfall near Ozuluama, Mexico
- Hurricane Anna (1961) – a Category 2 hurricane that made landfall in British Honduras (Belize)
- Hurricane Anna (1965) – a Category 2 hurricane that did not affect land
- Tropical Storm Anna (1969) – did not affect land, degenerating into a trough midway in its duration
- Tropical Storm Anna (1976) – affected the Azores, where its remnants executed a nearby counterclockwise loop

In the West Pacific:

- Tropical Storm Anna (1947) (T4701) – made landfall in Mindanao, Philippines

In the South-West Indian:

- Tropical Storm Anna (1960)

In Europe:

- Storm Anna (2025) – the first European windstorm to be named from a unified Northern EUMETNET Group naming list
