= List of storms named Alicia =

The name Alicia was used for two tropical cyclones: one in the Atlantic Ocean and one in the South-West Indian Ocean.

In the Atlantic:

- Hurricane Alicia (1983) – a Category 3 hurricane that caused destruction to Texas, causing US$3 billion in damage.

The name Alicia was retired after the 1983 season and was replaced with Allison.

In the South-West Indian Ocean:

- Cyclone Alicia (2020) – a tropical cyclone that did not affect any land.
