= List of storms named Aning =

The name Aning was used for seven tropical cyclones in the Philippine Area of Responsibility by PAGASA in the Western Pacific Ocean.

- Typhoon Pamela (1966) (T6635, 39W, Aning), Category 2 typhoon
- Tropical Storm Ruth (1970) (T7026, 28W, Aning)
- Typhoon Gloria (1974) (T7428, 32W, Aning), Category 4 typhoon
- Typhoon Ora (1978) (T7824, 25W, Aning), Category 2 typhoon
- Typhoon Pamela (1982) (T8224, 27W, Aning), crossed the Marshall Islands as a Category 3 typhoon, Guam as a tropical storm, then restrengthened to a typhoon before crossing the Philippines
- Typhoon Marge (1986) (T8628, 25W, Aning), crossed the southern Philippines as a Category 2 typhoon, then dissipated in the South China Sea
- Super Typhoon Orchid (1994) (T9426, 28W, Aning), struck Japan

When new sets of names were implemented in 2001, the name Aning was dropped from use.
