= List of storms named Anne =

The name Anne has been used for one tropical cyclone in the South Pacific Ocean and one European windstorm.

In the South Pacific:

- Cyclone Anne (1988) – a Category 4 severe tropical cyclone that became the strongest storm to affect New Caledonia in over a decade.

In Europe:

- Cyclone Anne (2014) – affected multiple countries in Western Europe.

== See also ==
- Storm Henk (2024) – a European windstorm that was named Annelie by the Free University of Berlin.
