= List of storms named Andy =

The name Andy has been used for three tropical cyclones in the northwest Pacific Ocean.

- Typhoon Andy (1982) (T8209, 10W, Iliang), struck Taiwan and China
- Severe Tropical Storm Andy (1985) (T8519, 18W), struck Vietnam
- Typhoon Andy (1989) (T8902, 02W), passed to the southeast of Guam in the mid-Pacific
