= List of storms named Alpha =

The names Alpha and Alfa have been used for three subtropical cyclones and one tropical cyclone in the Atlantic Ocean:

- Subtropical Storm Alpha (1972) – pre-season storm that made landfall in Georgia
- Subtropical Storm Alfa (1973) – briefly threatened Cape Cod but stayed out to sea
- Tropical Storm Alpha (2005) – moderately strong tropical storm that made landfall in the Dominican Republic before being absorbed by Hurricane Wilma
- Subtropical Storm Alpha (2020) – short-lived subtropical storm that made landfall in Portugal
