= List of storms named Allison =

The name Allison was used for three tropical cyclones in the Atlantic Ocean, and the alternative spelling Alison has been used for two tropical cyclones in the Australian region of the Indian Ocean, one in the South-West Indian Ocean, and one in the South Pacific Ocean.

In the Atlantic:

- Tropical Storm Allison (1989), partially developed from the remnants of Hurricane Cosme from the Pacific basin, it brought heavy rain to the southern United States, killing 11 and causing $500 million (1989 USD) in damage
- Hurricane Allison (1995), a Category 1 hurricane that made landfall on the Florida Panhandle as a tropical storm; killed 3 and caused minor damages
- Tropical Storm Allison (2001), struck Houston, Texas, killing 41 and causing $9 billion in damages, mostly due to heavy rains and flooding

The name Allison was retired after the 2001 hurricane season, and was replaced with Andrea.

In the Australian region:

- Cyclone Alison (1986), formed in the Timor Sea near Christmas Island before moving west; was renamed Krisostoma when it crossed 90°E
- Cyclone Alison (1998), affected the Cocos (Keeling) Islands

In the South-West Indian Ocean:

- Cyclone Alison (1991), stayed well away from land

In the South Pacific:

- Cyclone Alison (1975), formed near New Caledonia and moved south towards South Island, New Zealand
