= List of storms named Atring =

The name Atring has been used to name nine tropical cyclones in the Philippine Area of Responsibility by PAGASA in the Western Pacific Ocean.

- Tropical Depression Atring (1965), only recognized by PAGASA.
- Typhoon Susan (1969) (T6903, 03W, Atring)
- Tropical Storm Wilda (1973) (T7301, 01W, Atring), struck China
- Tropical Depression Atring (1977)
- Tropical Depression Atring (1981), designated as a tropical depression by PAGASA; not named as a tropical storm by the Joint Typhoon Warning Center (JTWC)
- Tropical Storm Fabian (1985) (T8501, 02W, Atring), passed near Yap
- Tropical Storm Winona (1989) (T8901, 01W, Atring), formed southeast of Hawaii; travelled west of the International Dateline and dissipated north of Mindanao
- Tropical Depression Atring (1993) (01W), formed near the Philippines; made landfall on Mindanao
- Tropical Storm Hannah (1997) (01W, Atring, Japan Meteorological Agency analyzed it as a tropical depression, not as a tropical storm), an early-season storm that approached the Philippines, but died out before affecting land
