= List of storms named Atu =

The name Atu has been used for three tropical cyclones in the South Pacific region of the Southern Hemisphere:

- Cyclone Atu (1983) – a Category 1 tropical cyclone that minimal affected Vanuatu.
- Cyclone Atu (1996) – a Category 1 tropical cyclone that minimal affected New Caledonia and Vanuatu.
- Cyclone Atu (2011) – a Category 4 severe tropical cyclone that affected Vanuatu.

The name Atu was retired in the South Pacific basin after the 2010–11 season.
