= List of storms named Akoni =

The name Akoni has been used for two tropical cyclones in the Central Pacific Ocean. The Hawaiian name ʻAkoni is derived from the English name Anthony.

- Tropical Storm Akoni (1982) – never threatened land
- Tropical Storm Akoni (2019) – weak tropical storm that did not threaten land
