= Cyclone Alan =

Category 1 South Pacific tropical cyclone in 1998

Tropical Cyclone Alan
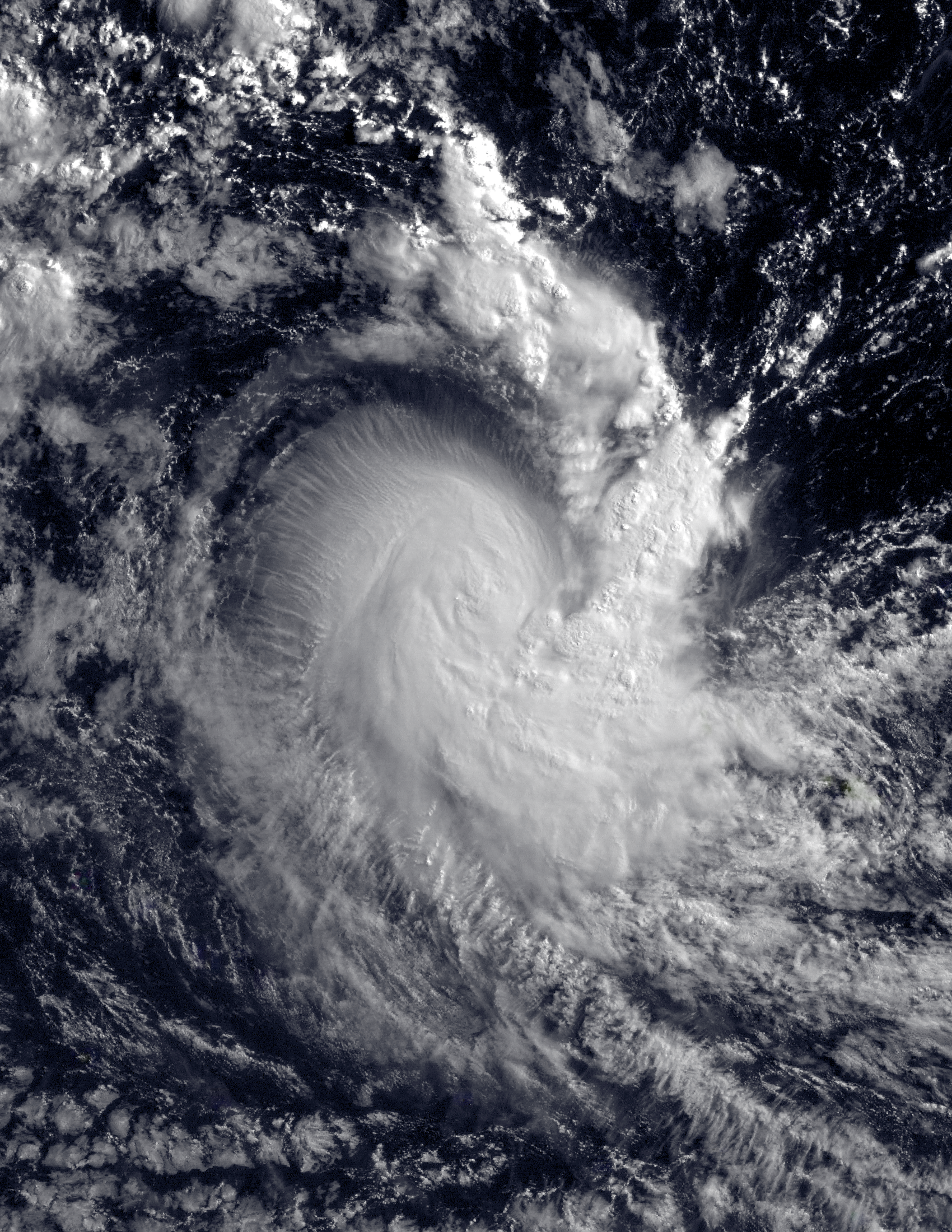
- Alan at its secondary peak intensity on April 24

Meteorological history
- Formed: April 17, 1998
- Dissipated: April 26, 1998

Category 1 tropical cyclone
- 10-minute sustained (FMS)
- Highest winds: 75 km/h (45 mph)
- Lowest pressure: 992 hPa (mbar); 29.29 inHg

Tropical storm
- 1-minute sustained (SSHWS/NPMOC)
- Highest winds: 85 km/h (50 mph)

Overall effects
- Fatalities: 10
- Areas affected: French Polynesia
- IBTrACS
- Part of the 1997–98 South Pacific cyclone season

Tropical Cyclone Alan was considered to be one of the worst natural disasters experienced in French Polynesia. The system, first noted as a tropical disturbance on April 17, 1998 east of the Northern Cook Islands, initially moved erratically prior to its designation as Alan upon developing into a tropical cyclone on April 21. The following day, Alan reached its estimated peak intensity with 10-minute maximum sustained wind speeds of 75 km/h (45 mph), posing several forecasting challenges due to difficulties in establishing its location and intensity. On April 23, Alan appeared to become sheared with the low-level circulation center displaced about 20 km (10 mi) from the nearest atmospheric convection. However, over the next day, after the mid-level trough of low pressure shearing the system moved faster than expected, Alan became better organized. While situated about 555 km (345 mi) west-northwest of the French Polynesian island of Tahiti, the system drifted south-southeastward. Early on April 25, Alan passed near to or over the French Polynesian Society Islands of Maupiti, Bora-Bora, and Raiatea. However, strong wind shear pulled the system apart, with visible imagery confirming the system's degeneration into a depression with a fully exposed low-level circulation. The system affected French Polynesia with high winds and torrential rain, causing several landslides on the Society Islands. The landslides resulted in the collapse of two bridges, and also overturned trees, in turn obstructing roads. Overall, ten people died as a result of the system, while thirty others were injured, with a majority of the casualties a result of landslides. On the islands of Raiatea, Taha'a and Huahine, several churches, schools and clinics were damaged, while water and electricity supplies were cut off. On the islands, around 750 houses were destroyed, with 430 and 150 wrecked on Huahine and Ra'iātea, respectively.

== Meteorological history ==
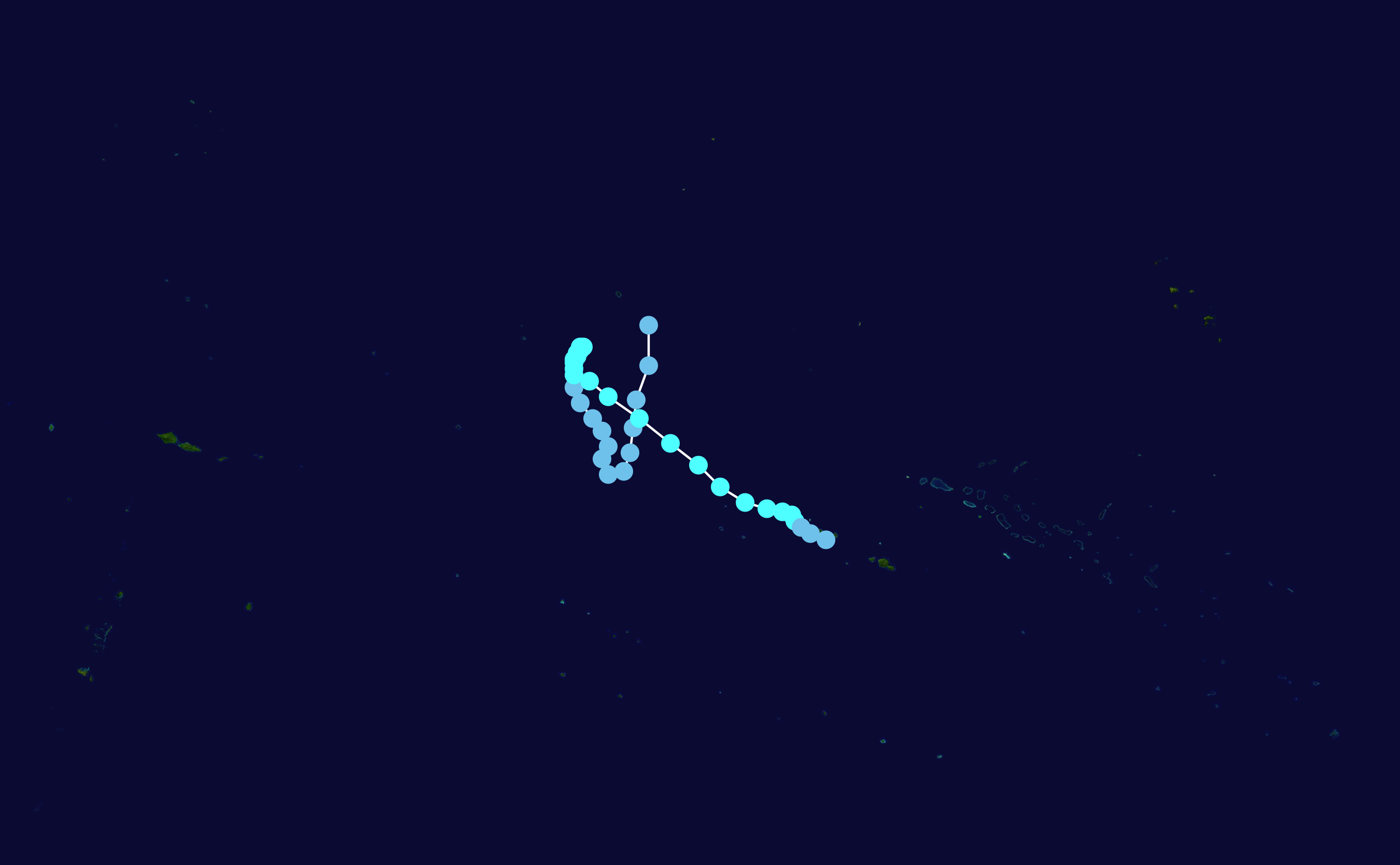
Map plotting the storm's track and intensity, according to the Saffir–Simpson scale Map key Saffir–Simpson scale Tropical depression (≤38 mph, ≤62 km/h) Tropical storm (39–73 mph, 63–118 km/h) Category 1 (74–95 mph, 119–153 km/h) Category 2 (96–110 mph, 154–177 km/h) Category 3 (111–129 mph, 178–208 km/h) Category 4 (130–156 mph, 209–251 km/h) Category 5 (≥157 mph, ≥252 km/h) Unknown Storm type Tropical cyclone Subtropical cyclone Extratropical cyclone, remnant low, tropical disturbance, or monsoon depression

On April 17, 1998, the Fiji Meteorological Service (FMS) started to monitor the development of a tropical disturbance east of the Northern Cook Islands. Before the FMS initiated advisories on the system on April 19, the system moved erratically; it later developed into a weak depression while it located about 555 km (345 mi) north of Manihiki Atoll in the Northern Cook Islands. Over the next couple of days, the system slowly moved northwards, gradually organizing, with gale-force winds developing in its southern quadrant on April 20. Over the next day, the system developed into a category 1 tropical cyclone on the Australian tropical cyclone intensity scale, before the FMS named the system Alan at 1800 UTC. By this time, the cyclone, located about 300 km (185 mi) east-southeast of Manihiki, started to move westwards. On April 22, the FMS estimated that Alan had reached its peak intensity with 10-minute maximum sustained wind speeds of 40 kn (75 km/h; 45 mph), just as the system started to pose several forecasting challenges due to difficulties in establishing its location and intensity. Later that day the Naval Pacific Meteorology and Oceanography Center (NPMOC) started to issue warnings on Alan and accidentally assigned it the designation 32P as opposed to 36P, estimating peak 1-minute sustained wind speeds of 85 km/h (50 mph).

On April 23, the system appeared to become sheared, with the low-level circulation center displaced about 20 km (10 mi) from the nearest atmospheric convection. As a result, the FMS reported Alan's weakening into a depression, while the NPMOC subsequently issued their final advisory on the system. Over the next day, as a mid-level trough of low pressure shearing Alan moved faster than expected, the depression became better organized and developed favorable upper-level outflow. As a result, the NPMOC initiated advisories on the system again on April 24, and later that day, the FMS reported that Alan re-intensified into a Category 1 tropical cyclone. While located about 555 km (345 mi) west-northwest of the French Polynesian island of Tahiti, the system moved south-southeastward under the influence of an upper-level anticyclone located to its east. Early on April 25, Alan passed near to or over the French Polynesian Society Islands of Maupiti, Bora-Bora, and Ra'iātea. As the system moved near Bora Bora, a maximum wind gust of 147 km/h (91 mph) and a pressure observation of 1002 hPa (29.6 inHg) were recorded, indicating the minimal strength of Alan; however, the wind gust was stronger than that expected of similarly intense tropical cyclones. It was later speculated that squalls within Alan's convective feeder band may have been responsible for the stronger wind gusts. On April 25, strong wind shear pulled the system apart, with visible imagery revealing a fully exposed low-level circulation. As a result, the FMS reported that the system weakened into a depression at 1800 UTC that day, while located about 185 km (115 mi) west-northwest of Tahiti. The NPMOC subsequently reissued their final advisory early the next day as the system drifted south-southeastward while located west of Tahiti.

== Preparations and impact ==
Cyclone Alan produced high winds and torrential rain over French Polynesia between April 24 and 25, causing several landslides on the Society Islands, resulting in the collapse of two bridges and obstruction of roads by fallen trees. Damage associated with the system was mainly confined to the Leeward Islands of Bora Bora, Tahaa, Ra'iātea and Huahine, which had all been damaged by Cyclone Osea earlier in the season. Overall, ten people died as a result of the system, while thirty others were injured, with the majority of the casualties occurring due to landslides. On Bora Bora, wind gusts of up to 147 km/h (91 mph) were reported, while on Tahaa, wind gusts of up to 95 km/h (60 mph) were reported. On the islands of Ra'iātea, Tahaa and Huahine, several churches, schools and clinics were damaged, while water and electricity supplies were cut off. On the islands, around 750 houses were destroyed, with 430 and 150 wrecked on Huahine and Ra'iātea, respectively.

On Huahine, the extent of the damage, along with a sharp dip on the Uturoa barograph trace, suggested that a tornado may have been spawned in one of Alan's convective bands. In the system's aftermath a, 60-person relief team was deployed from Tahiti to the affected islands to assist with emergency operations. The French President Jacques Chirac and Prime Minister Lionel Jospin both sent messages of support to the Leeward Islands, and in French Polynesia, the system was considered to be one of the worst natural disasters in the islands' history. A few days after Cyclone Alan impacted the islands, Cyclone Bart caused an additional ten deaths and some minor damage to the French territory. During December 1998, the European Community Humanitarian Office responded to a government appeal, providing €105,000 for tents, medical aid, food and clothing.

== See also ==
- Cyclone Wasa
- Cyclone Oli
