= List of storms named Ading =

The name Ading has been used in the Philippines by PAGASA and its predecessor, the Philippine Weather Bureau, for four tropical cyclones in the Northwestern Pacific Ocean:

- Typhoon Gilda (1967) (T6737, 39W, Ading), which weakened before making landfall on Taiwan
- Tropical Storm Della (1971) (T7130, 32W, Ading), which formed off the coast of Luzon, and made landfall over Hainan and Vietnam
- Tropical Storm Wayne (1979) (T7922, 25W, Ading), which made landfall on Luzon as a tropical depression
- Tropical Storm Ruth (1983) (T8321, 22W, Ading), a system that dissipated at sea due to strong wind shear
