= List of storms named Anding =

The name Anding has been used for three tropical cyclones in the Philippine Area of Responsibility by PAGASA and its predecessor, the Philippine Weather Bureau, in the Western Pacific Ocean.

- Typhoon Carmen (1965) (T6530, 35W, Anding), remained over the open ocean, caused seven Japanese fishing vessels to capsize
- Typhoon Irma (1981) (T8126, 26W, Anding), brought significant damage and flooding to the Philippines
- Typhoon Dot (1993) (T9320, 24W, Anding), traversed the Philippines and then made landfall at Hong Kong
