= 1960–61 South-West Indian Ocean cyclone season =

Cyclone season in the Southwest Indian Ocean

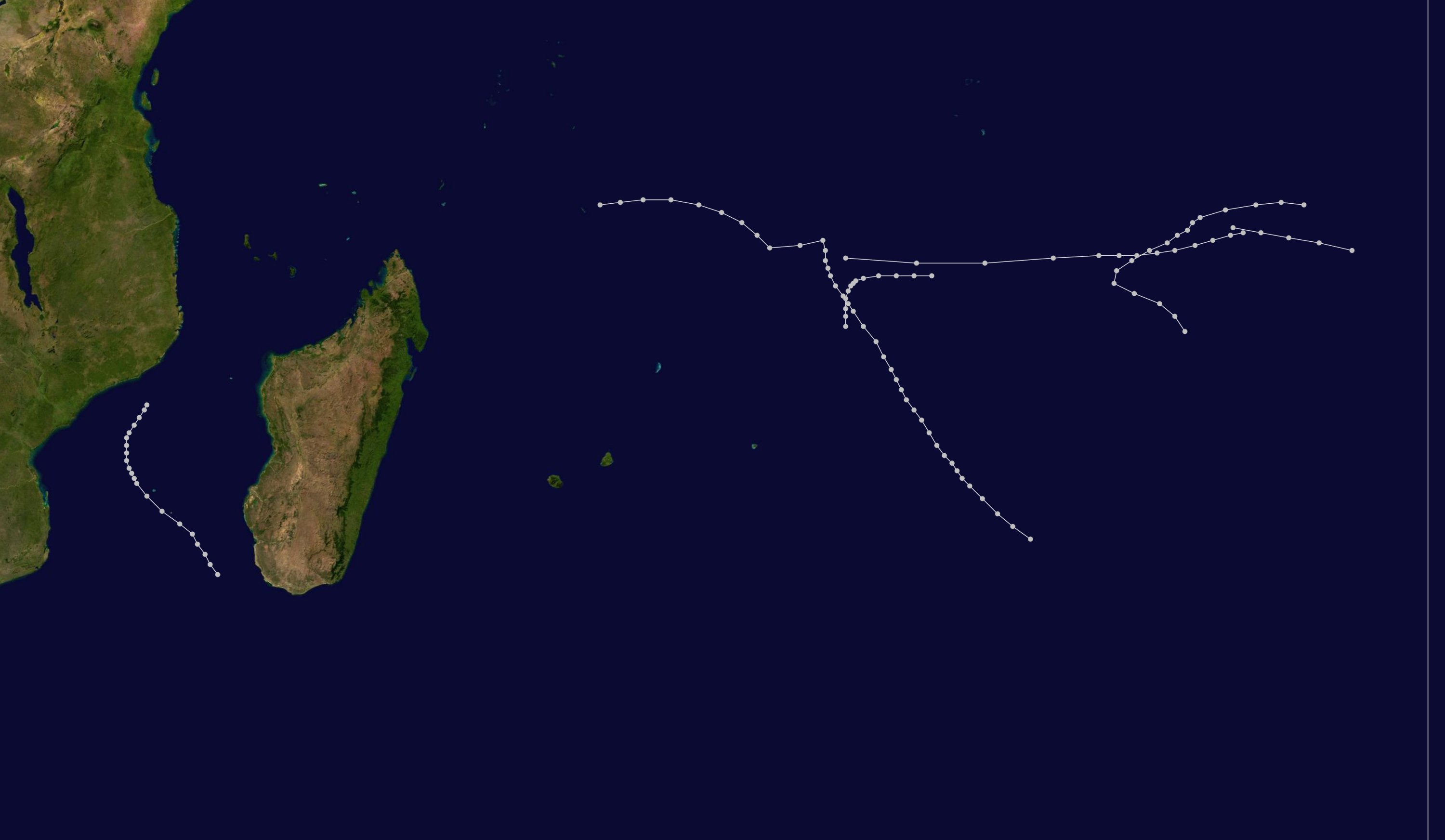
- Season summary map

Seasonal boundaries
- First system formed: November 11, 1960
- Last system dissipated: February 10, 1961

Strongest storm
- Name: Doris
  - Maximum winds: 150 km/h (90 mph) (1-minute sustained)

Seasonal statistics
- Total depressions: 6
- Total storms: 4
- Tropical cyclones: 1
- Total fatalities: Unknown
- Total damage: Unknown

Related articles
- 1960–61 Australian region cyclone season; 1960–61 South Pacific cyclone season

The 1960–61 South-West Indian Ocean cyclone season was one of the least active South-West Indian Ocean cyclone seasons on record. It only had 6 tropical depressions, 5 named storms, 4 tropical storms, and 1 cyclone, Doris. Additionally, none of its storms made landfall, therefore it had almost no deaths or damage. The season was also the second with named storms, the first being 1959–60.

== Systems ==
=== Tropical Storm Anna ===
- Tropical storm (SSHWS)
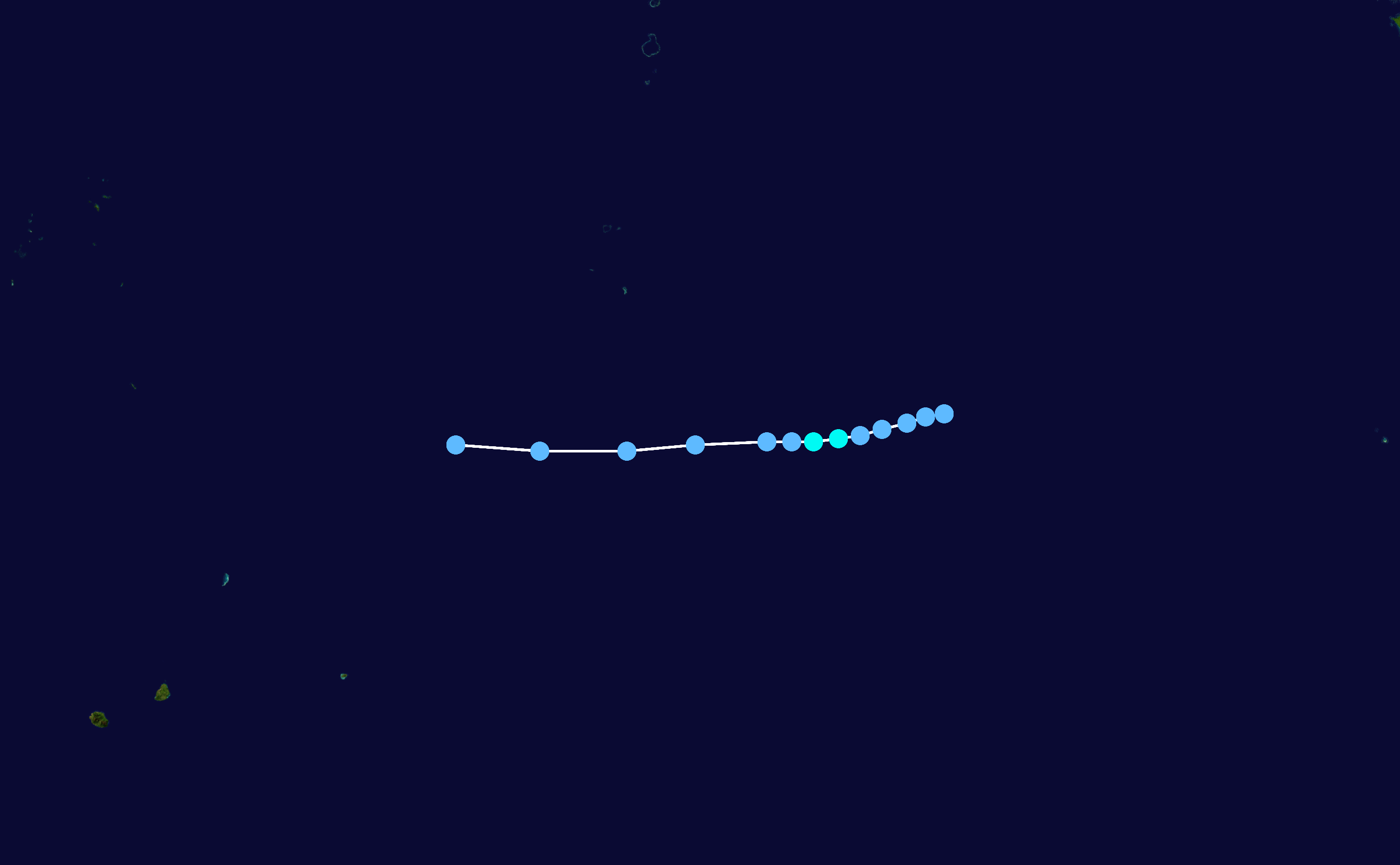
- Duration: November 11 – November 14
- Peak intensity: 65 km/h (40 mph) (1-min);

Ana existed from November 11 to November 14. Its peak intensity was 65 kilometers an hour, or 40 miles per hour, in 1-minute maximum sustained winds.

=== Unnamed tropical depression ===
A tropical depression briefly existed in the northeast portion of the basin from November 29–30. Its peak intensity is currently unknown.

=== Tropical Storm Barbara ===
- Tropical storm (SSHWS)
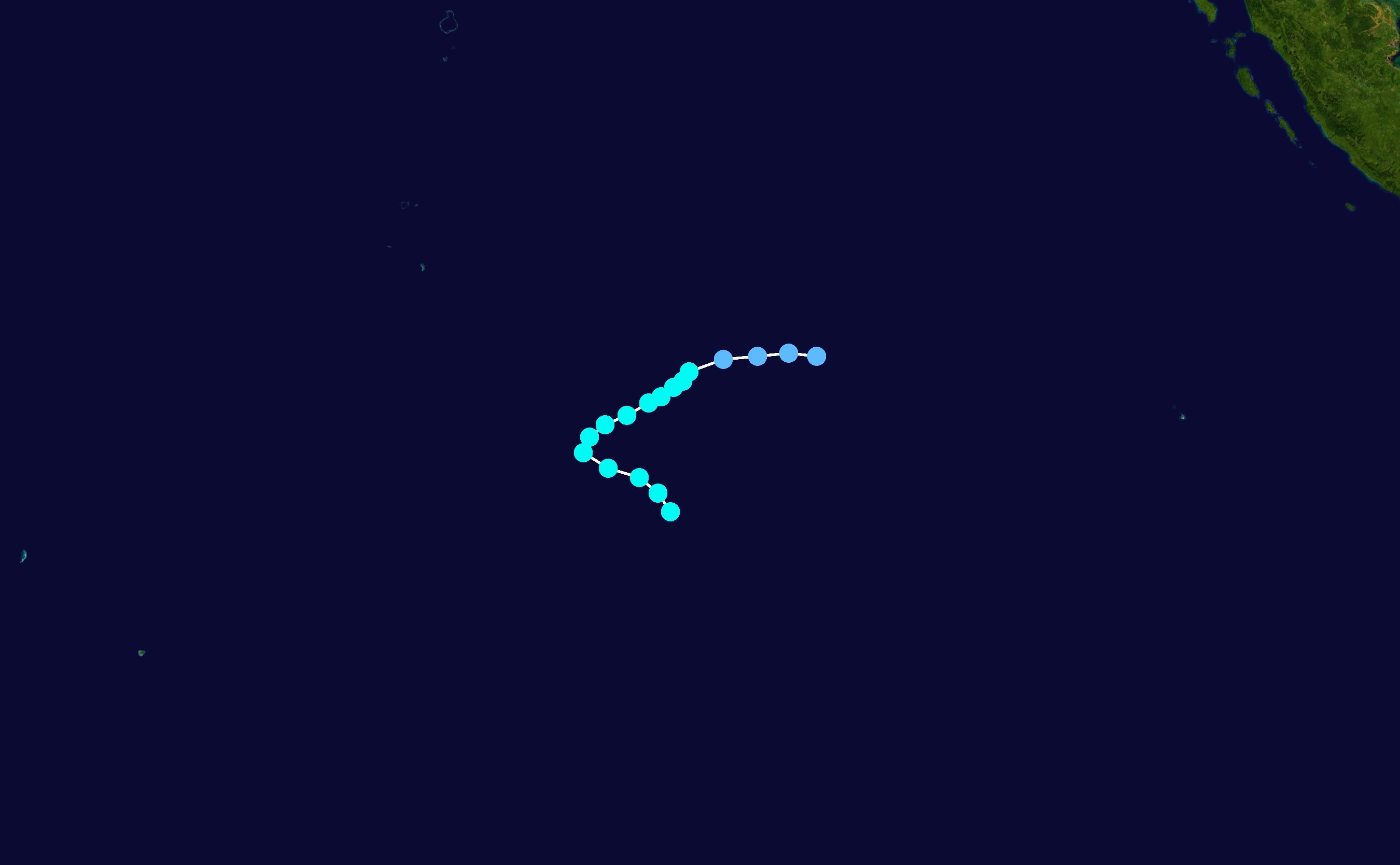
- Duration: November 29 – December 3
- Peak intensity: 85 km/h (50 mph) (1-min);

Barbara existed from November 27 to December 3. In 1-minute maximum sustained winds, its peak intensity was 85 miles per hour. That is equal to 50 kilometers per hour. For its whole duration, it stayed away from land.

=== Tropical Storm Clara ===
- Tropical storm (SSHWS)
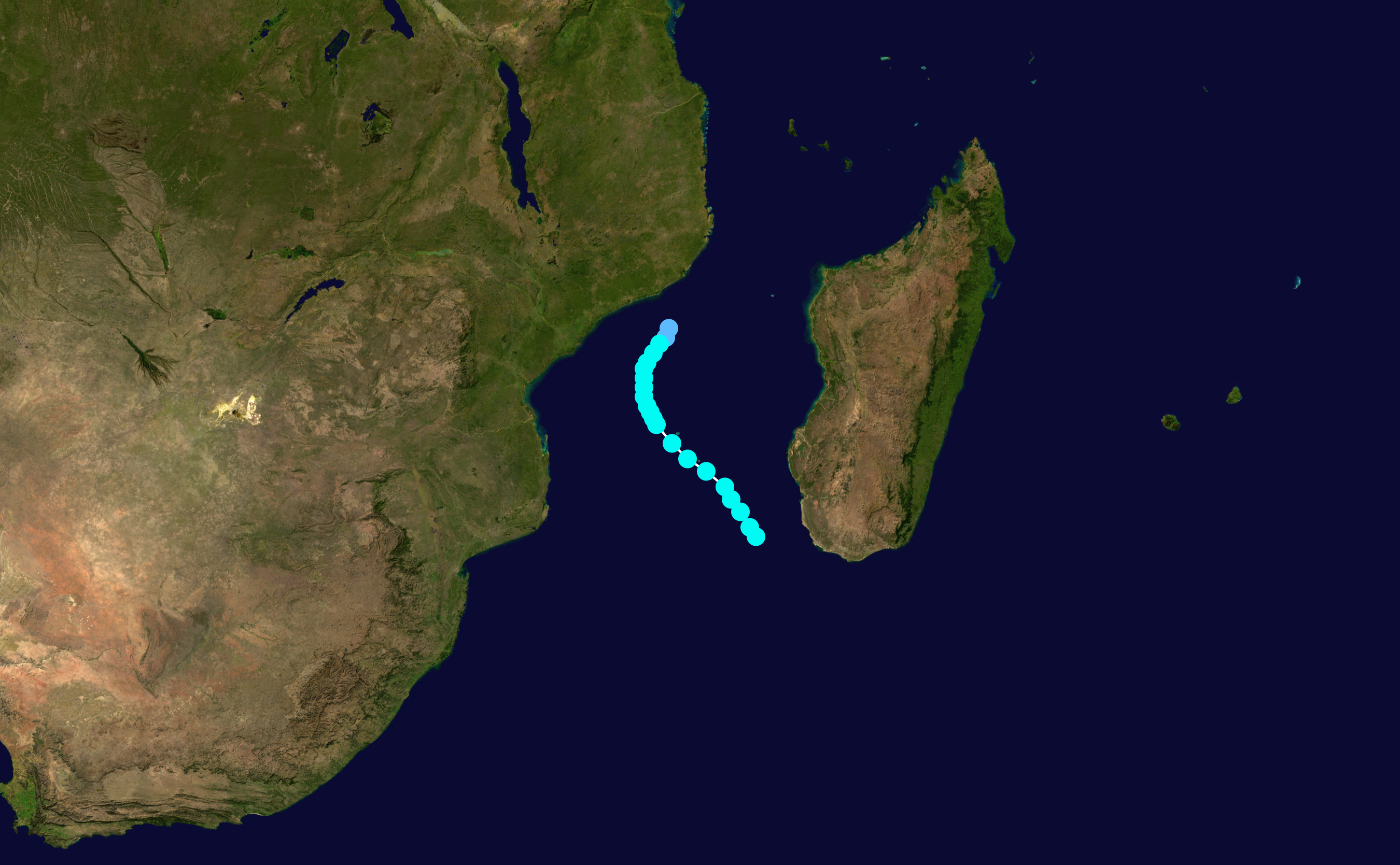
- Duration: January 1 – January 6
- Peak intensity: 85 km/h (50 mph) (1-min);

Clara, a slow-moving tropical cyclone, lasted from January 1 to January 6 and, twice, nearly made landfall. On New Year's Day, it formed near Madagascar. Moving west-northwestward, Clara reached its peak intensity of 85 mph (50 km/h). As it dissipated, Clara's remnants drifted over Mozambique.

=== Tropical Cyclone Doris ===
- Category 1 tropical cyclone (SSHWS)
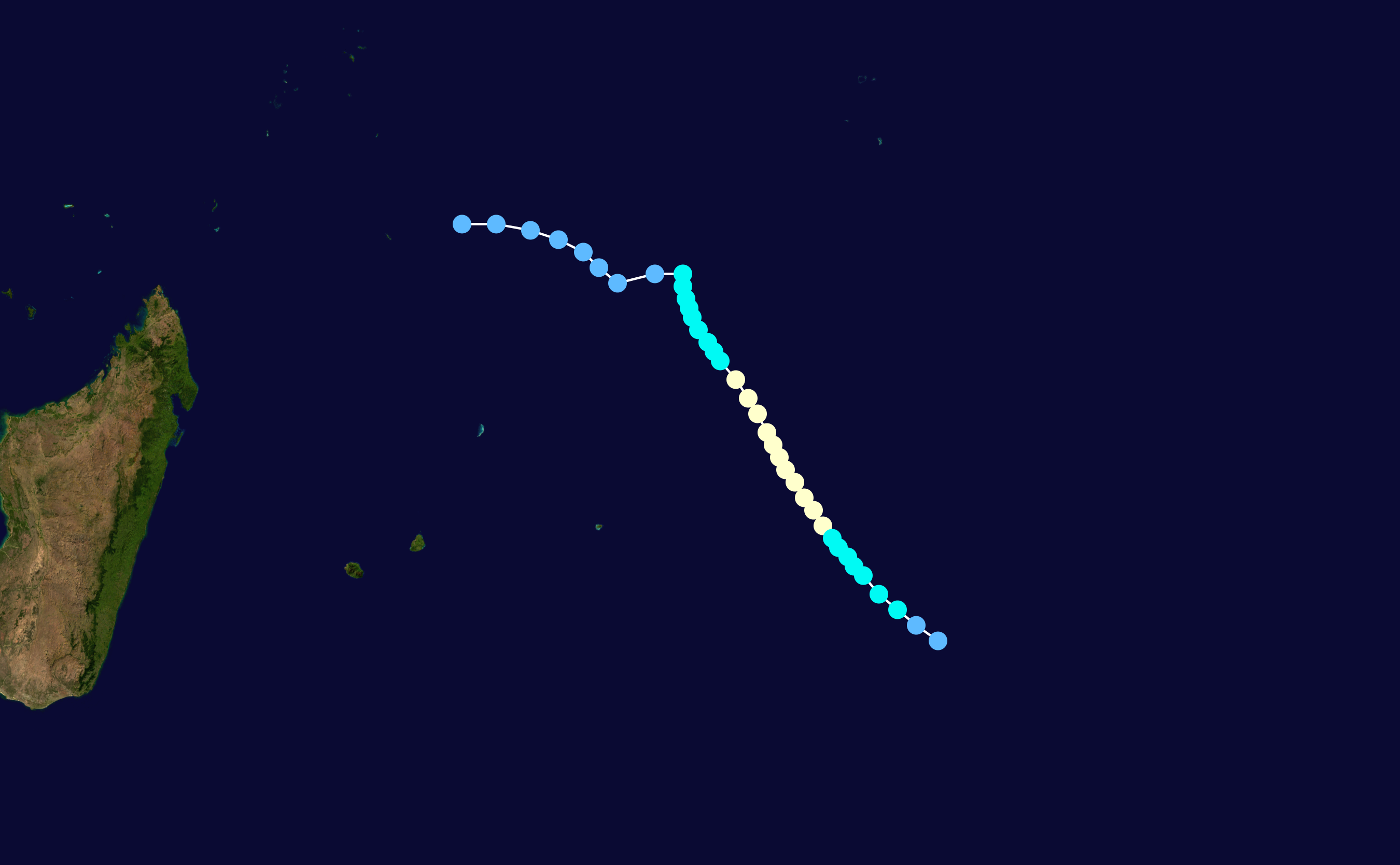
- Duration: January 24 – February 2
- Peak intensity: 150 km/h (90 mph) (1-min);

Doris was the only storm of the season to reach cyclone strength. On January 24, 1961, it formed east of Madagascar. A few days later, Doris reached its peak intensity, with 1-minute maximum sustained winds of 90 mph or 150 km/h. Moving southeast, it began to weaken. Doris finally dissipated on February 2, lasting 9 days.

=== Tropical Depression Eva ===
- Tropical depression (SSHWS)
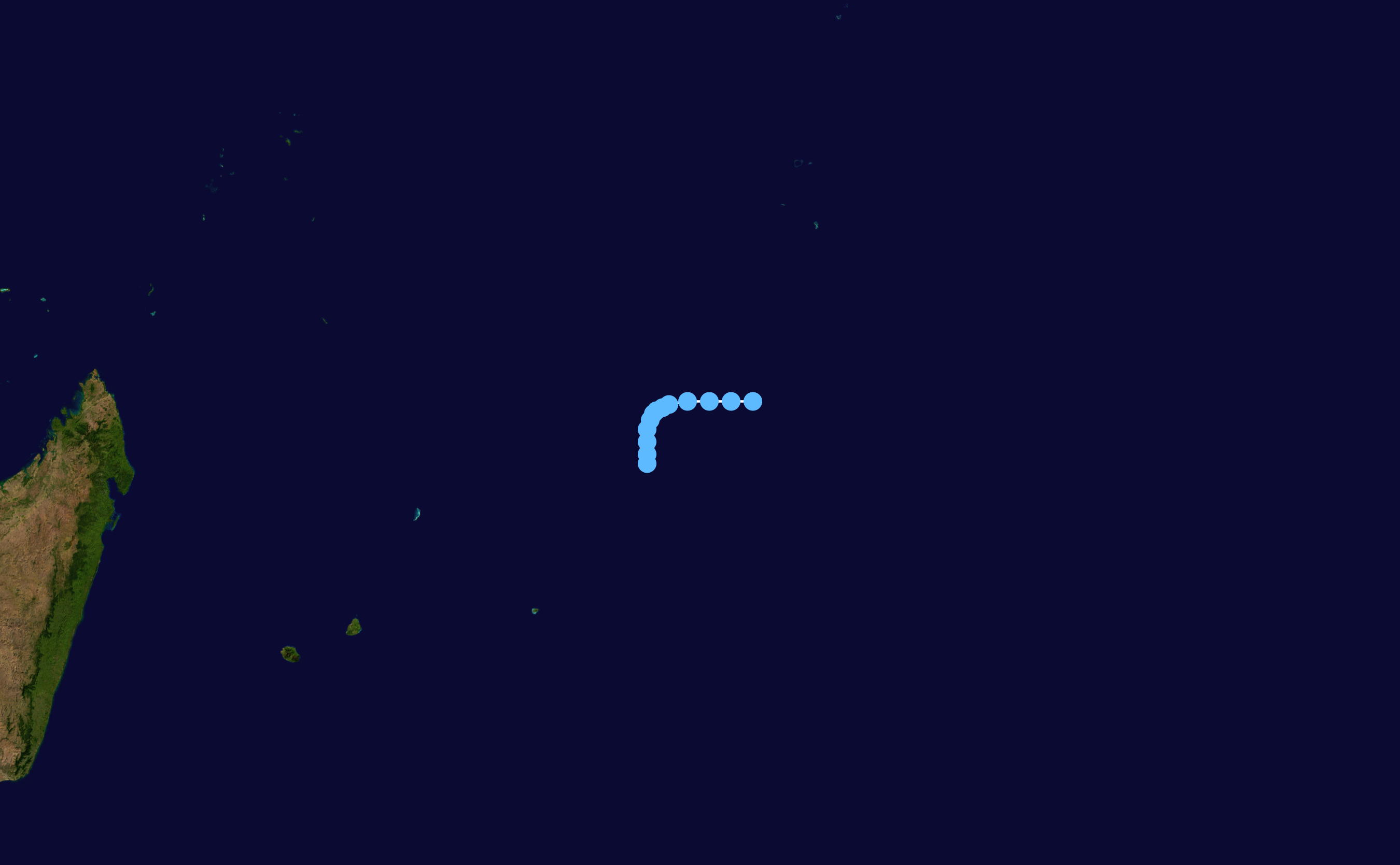
- Duration: February 7 – February 10
- Peak intensity: 55 km/h (35 mph) (1-min);

On February 7, 1961, the final storm of the season, Eva, formed. However, it soon encountered unfavorable conditions, and dissipated on February 10, 3 days later. Its 1-minute peak intensity was 55 km/h (35 mph).

== See also ==
- Atlantic hurricane seasons: 1960, 1961
- Eastern Pacific hurricane seasons: 1960, 1961
- Western Pacific typhoon seasons: 1960, 1961
- North Indian Ocean cyclone seasons: 1960, 1961
- 1960s Australian region cyclone seasons
- 1960s South Pacific cyclone seasons
