= Tropical Storm Dujuan (2021) =

Pacific tropical storm in 2021

Tropical Storm Dujuan (Auring)
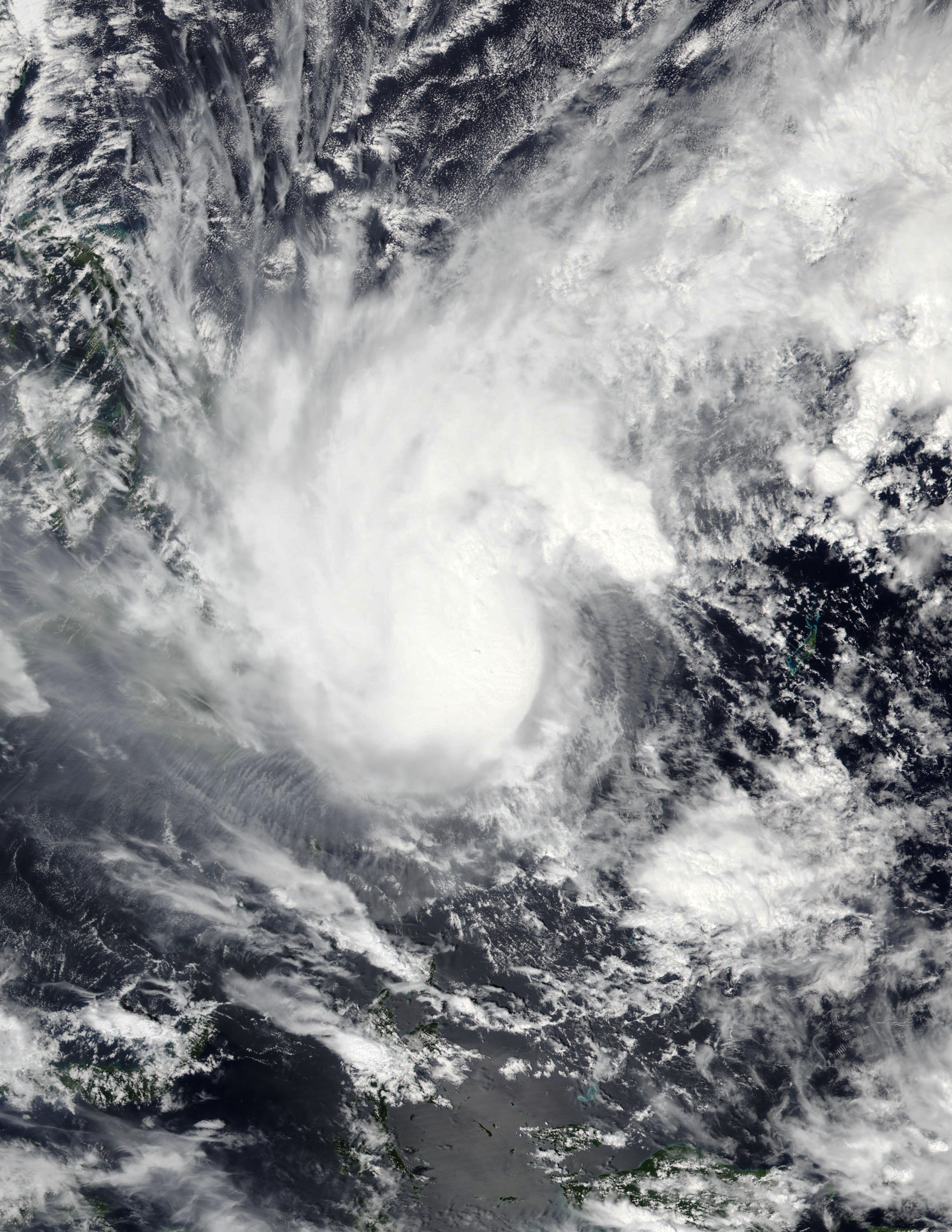
- Dujuan at peak intensity over the Philippine Sea on February 19

Meteorological history
- Formed: February 16, 2021
- Dissipated: February 23, 2021

Tropical storm
- 10-minute sustained (JMA)
- Highest winds: 75 km/h (45 mph)
- Lowest pressure: 996 hPa (mbar); 29.41 inHg

Tropical storm
- 1-minute sustained (SSHWS/JTWC)
- Highest winds: 85 km/h (50 mph)
- Lowest pressure: 991 hPa (mbar); 29.26 inHg

Overall effects
- Fatalities: 1
- Missing: 4
- Damage: $3.29 million (2021 USD)
- Areas affected: Palau, Philippines
- IBTrACS
- Part of the 2021 Pacific typhoon season

Tropical Storm Dujuan, known in the Philippines as Tropical Storm Auring, was a tropical storm which caused heavy rain in the Philippines and Palau, leading to minor damage. Dujuan was the second depression and first named storm of the 2021 Pacific typhoon season. Dujuan started as a tropical depression in the Philippine Sea which slowly tracked northwestward towards the Philippines. Its strength fluctuated from February 19 to 21 due to an unfavorable environment near the storm at the time. The system was declared a tropical storm prior to its landfall in Batag Island, Laoang, Northern Samar on February 22.

Dujuan caused no casualties in Palau. In the Philippines, however, the storm caused 1 death and left 4 missing. The storm also caused a fishing vessel to capsize, leaving 15 Filipino fisherman adrift for six days before being rescued. Floodwater inundated houses in Surigao del Sur, submerging Tandag City along with 3,168 hectares of cropland. Total damages in the Philippines amounted to at least $3.29 million (2021 USD).

== Meteorological history ==
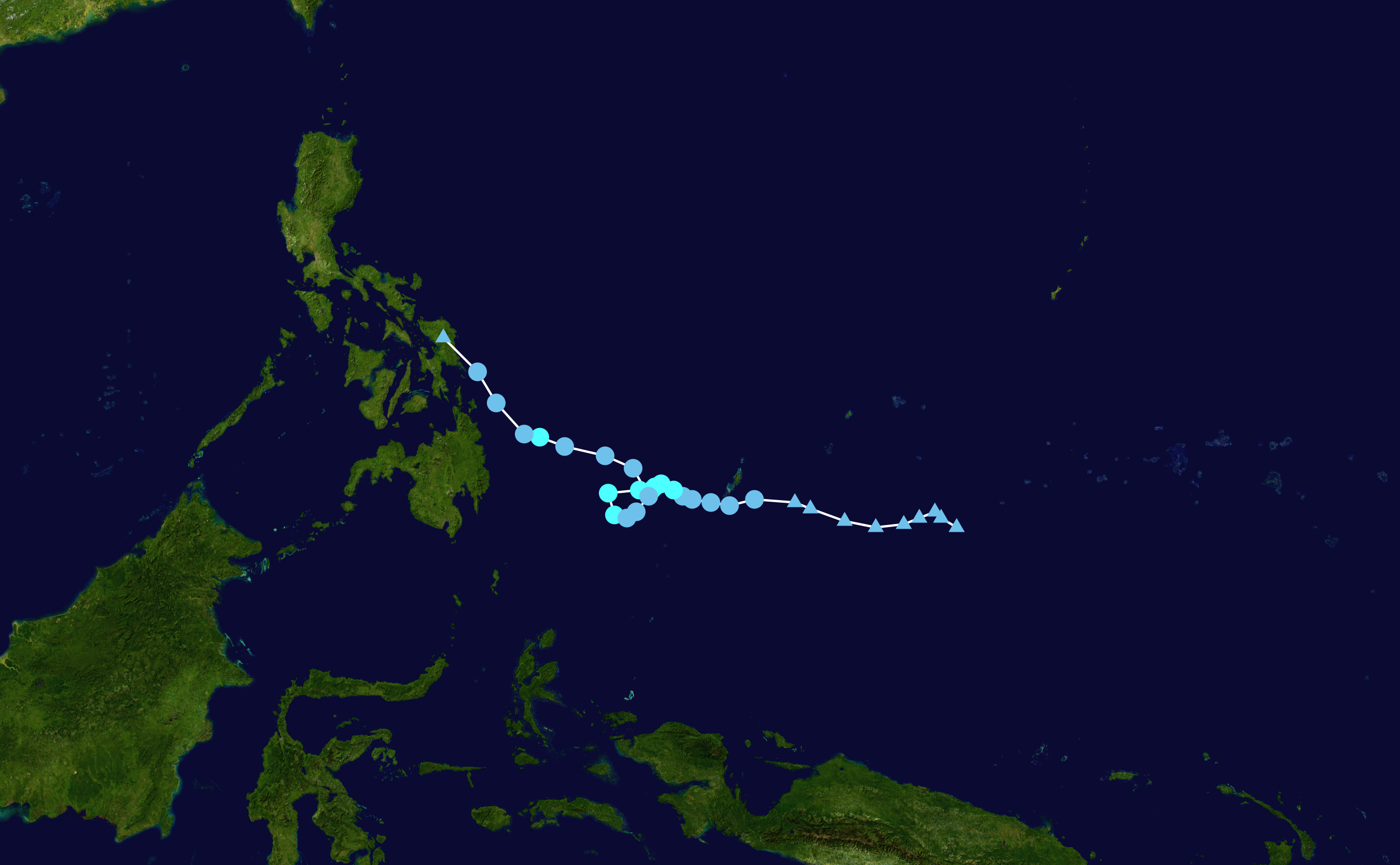
Map plotting the storm's track and intensity, according to the Saffir–Simpson scale Map key Saffir–Simpson scale Tropical depression (≤38 mph, ≤62 km/h) Tropical storm (39–73 mph, 63–118 km/h) Category 1 (74–95 mph, 119–153 km/h) Category 2 (96–110 mph, 154–177 km/h) Category 3 (111–129 mph, 178–208 km/h) Category 4 (130–156 mph, 209–251 km/h) Category 5 (≥157 mph, ≥252 km/h) Unknown Storm type Tropical cyclone Subtropical cyclone Extratropical cyclone, remnant low, tropical disturbance, or monsoon depression

On February 16 at 06:00 UTC, the Japan Meteorological Agency (JMA) reported that a tropical depression had developed over the Philippine Sea. Eight hours later, the JTWC issued a Tropical Cyclone Formation Alert (TCFA) on the system, while it was located roughly 15 miles (24 km) to the east of Babeldaob, Palau. The depression displayed convective banding features, wrapping into a disorganized low-level center of circulation. Within an area favorable for further development, with low to moderate vertical wind shear, strong poleward outflow, and 29–30 °C (84–86 °F) sea surface temperatures, the system began to intensify. By 3:00 UTC on February 17, the depression had entered the Philippine Area of Responsibility (PAR), and was given the name Auring by the PAGASA. This made Dujuan the first named storm within the PAR in 2021. Three hours later, the JTWC upgraded the system to a tropical depression, giving it the designation 01W. As the system tracked to the west-northwest, it continued to strengthen until the early hours of February 18, when it was upgraded to a tropical storm by the JMA, JTWC, and the PAGASA, with the JMA giving it the name Dujuan. (Note: The name Dujuan (Mandarin: 杜鹃, [tu˥˩ t͡ɕyɛn˥]) was contributed by China and means azalea in Mandarin.)

At 03:00 UTC on February 19, the PAGASA briefly upgraded Dujuan into a severe tropical storm, before downgrading it back. The next day, vertical wind shear in Dujuan's environment had decreased, allowing the storm to slightly re-strengthen. The vertical wind shear associated with the northeast monsoon still persisted, affecting the system, and on February 21, the JMA downgraded Dujuan to a tropical depression. The JTWC and the PAGASA followed on the next day as the system's low-level circulation center (LLCC) had weakened prior to landfall. The JMA and the JTWC issued their final advisories moments after. The storm made landfall over Batag Island in Laoang, Northern Samar at 09:00 PHT (01:00 UTC) on the same day. Prior to crossing the Rapu-Rapu Islands in Albay, the PAGASA declared the storm as a low-pressure area and issued their final bulletin on the storm. Dujuan dissipated on February 23 at 06:00 UTC.

== Preparations and impact ==
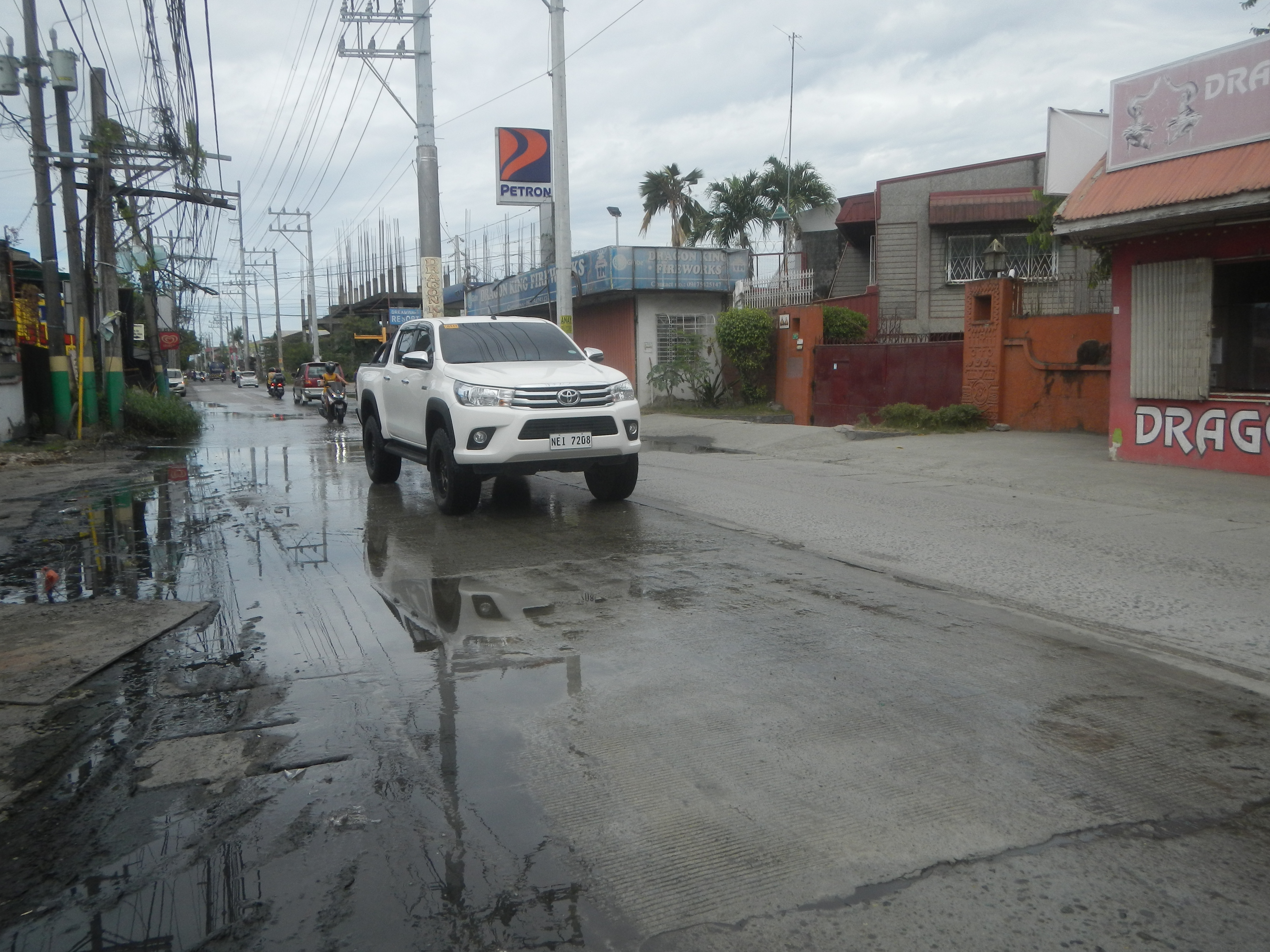
Overcast skies and rain puddles associated with Dujuan in Bocaue on February 21

Dujuan briefly moved over Palau on February 16 as a tropical depression, bringing heavy rainfall to parts of the country. On February 18, the boat of 15 Filipino fishermen capsized off the coast of Surigao, leaving the group adrift for six days until they were rescued by the Philippine Coast Guard.

In anticipation of the storm, the PAGASA issued Signal #1 warnings for the eastern section of Mindanao on February 19, with the same warnings issued on the eastern provinces of Visayas. Signal 2 warnings were also issued in the majority of Eastern Samar, Samar, Southern Leyte, Dinagat Islands, and Surigao del Norte on February 21 as Dujuan re-intensified hours before landfall. The warnings were quickly lowered, however, just a few hours after being issued. Despite the lowered warnings, the storm was able to cause flooding in parts of Visayas. Before the storm's landfall, in Tandag City, Surigao del Sur, heavy rains had already caused houses to be submerged in floodwater. Classes and government work was suspended on February 22 in Romblon, Tacloban City, and Negros Oriental and in parts of Leyte, Cebu, Davao de Oro, and Surigao del Sur.

A total of 280,881 individuals were affected in Northern Mindanao, Caraga, and in the Davao Region. At least 183,226 of the affected individuals were taken to 950 various evacuation shelters in each region. 2,408 houses were damaged, with 444 houses becoming totally damaged. Most of the damage occurred in the Caraga Administrative Region. 42 domestic flights and multiple sea trips were also cancelled due to the harsh weather. An analysis by the STAMINA4Space Program revealed that over 3,412 hectares of land had been inundated due to floods from Dujuan, with 92% (3,168 ha) of the land being cropland. The cropland only contained sparse vegetation at the time, however. In the Philippines, one person was reported dead with four others reported missing. Agricultural damages stood at ₱79.4 million while infrastructural damages stood at ₱23.6 million, for a total of ₱103 million (US$3.29 million). Aon estimates that total losses in the Philippines reached at least $10 million (2021 USD).

== See also ==
- Weather of 2021
- Tropical cyclones in 2021
- Tropical Storm Sanba (2018)
- Tropical Storm Thelma
