= List of storms named Andrea =

The name Andrea has been used for three tropical cyclones, two subtropical cyclones, and one extratropical cyclone worldwide.

In the Atlantic Ocean:

- Subtropical Storm Andrea (2007) – formed near Florida, curved to the north, bringing rain to portions of the Southeast United States
- Tropical Storm Andrea (2013) – made landfall in Florida, killing three, and causing minor damage
- Subtropical Storm Andrea (2019) – weak and short-lived subtropical storm over the western Atlantic
- Tropical Storm Andrea (2025) – weak and short-lived storm over the central Atlantic

In the Indian Ocean:

- Cyclone Andrea (1970) – remained out at sea

In Europe:

- Storm Andrea (2012) – extratropical European windstorm that brought severe weather to Western and Northern Europe
