= List of storms named Aring =

The name Aring has been used for four tropical cyclones in the Philippine Area of Responsibility in the West Pacific Ocean:

- Typhoon Sally (1964) (T6418, 27W, Aring) – a Category 5-equivalent super typhoon that killed over 200 people in South Korea.
- Tropical Storm Nora (1976) (T7625, 25W, Aring) – a severe tropical storm that affected the Philippines.
- Typhoon Betty (1980) (T8021, 25W, Aring) – a Category 4-equivalent typhoon that made landfall in the Philippines, causing over 100 fatalities and becoming the country's third-costliest tropical cyclone at the time.
- Typhoon Doyle (1984) (T8427, 30W, Aring) – a Category 4-equivalent super typhoon.
