= List of storms named Alvin =

The name Alvin has been used for five tropical cyclones worldwide, four in the Eastern Pacific Ocean and once in the South-West Indian Ocean.

In the Eastern Pacific:

- Tropical Storm Alvin (2007) – did not affect land
- Tropical Storm Alvin (2013) – stayed far from land
- Hurricane Alvin (2019) – Category 1 hurricane that did not affect land
- Tropical Storm Alvin (2025) – affected El Salvador and Mexico without making landfall

In the South-West Indian:

- Cyclone Bertie–Alvin (2005) – initially known as Severe Tropical Cyclone Bertie while in the Australian region, before moving into the South-West Indian Ocean basin; did not affect land
