= List of storms named Anika =

The name Anika has been used for two tropical cyclones in the Australian region.

- Cyclone Anika (2008) – a Category 2 tropical cyclone that affected the Cocos Islands.
- Cyclone Anika (2022) – a Category 2 tropical cyclone that made two landfalls in Western Australia.

== See also ==
Storms with similar names

- Tropical Storm Alika (2002) – a Central Pacific Ocean tropical storm.
- Storm Dorothea (2024) – a European windstorm that was named Anka by the Free University of Berlin.
