= Typhoon Abe (1990) =

Pacific typhoon in 1990

Typhoon Abe (Iliang)
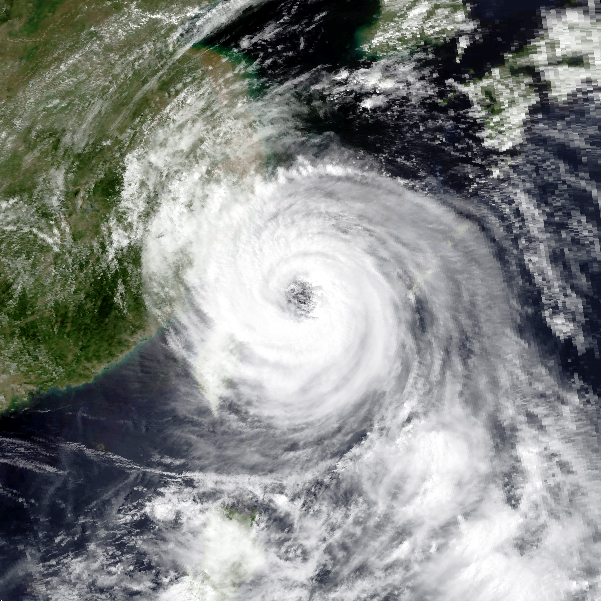
- Typhoon Abe on August 30

Meteorological history
- Formed: August 24, 1990
- Extratropical: September 1, 1990
- Dissipated: September 3, 1990

Typhoon
- 10-minute sustained (JMA)
- Highest winds: 140 km/h (85 mph)
- Lowest pressure: 955 hPa (mbar); 28.20 inHg

Category 2-equivalent typhoon
- 1-minute sustained (SSHWS/JTWC)
- Highest winds: 165 km/h (105 mph)

Overall effects
- Fatalities: 108–195
- Damage: ~$748 million (1990 USD)
- Areas affected: Caroline Islands, Mariana Islands, Japan, Taiwan, China, Korea
- IBTrACS
- Part of the 1990 Pacific typhoon season

Typhoon Abe, known as Typhoon Iliang in the Philippines, was the fourteenth named storm of 1990 Pacific typhoon season. Forming on August 23 from a tropical disturbance, the depression which would eventually develop into Typhoon Abe initially tracked in a steady west-northwestward direction. As a result of an intense monsoon surge, Abe's trajectory briefly changed to an eastward then northward path before returning to its original track. Abe only intensified by a small amount between 00:00 UTC August 24 and 06:00 UTC August 27 due to the disruptive effects of the surge, and on August 30, Abe peaked in intensity as a Category 2-equivalent typhoon on the Saffir–Simpson hurricane wind scale. After peaking in intensity, Abe crossed the Ryukyu Islands and the East China Sea, making landfall in China where it affected the provinces of Zhejiang and Jiangsu before entering the Yellow Sea, crossing South Korea, and finally transitioning into an extratropical cyclone.

Typhoon Abe killed 108–195 people after it caused flooding and landslides in the Philippines and Taiwan, ravaged coastal areas of China, and brought high waves to Japan. Abe, which is responsible for killing 108 in China, affected half of Zhejiang's land area and a fourth of its population, leaving thousands homeless and causing ¥3.5 billion yuan (RMB, $741.5–743 million USD) to be lost in damages. Additional damage and one fatality occurred in Okinawa Prefecture in Japan, where at least ¥890 million yen (JPY, $6 million USD) in damage was caused.

== Meteorological history ==
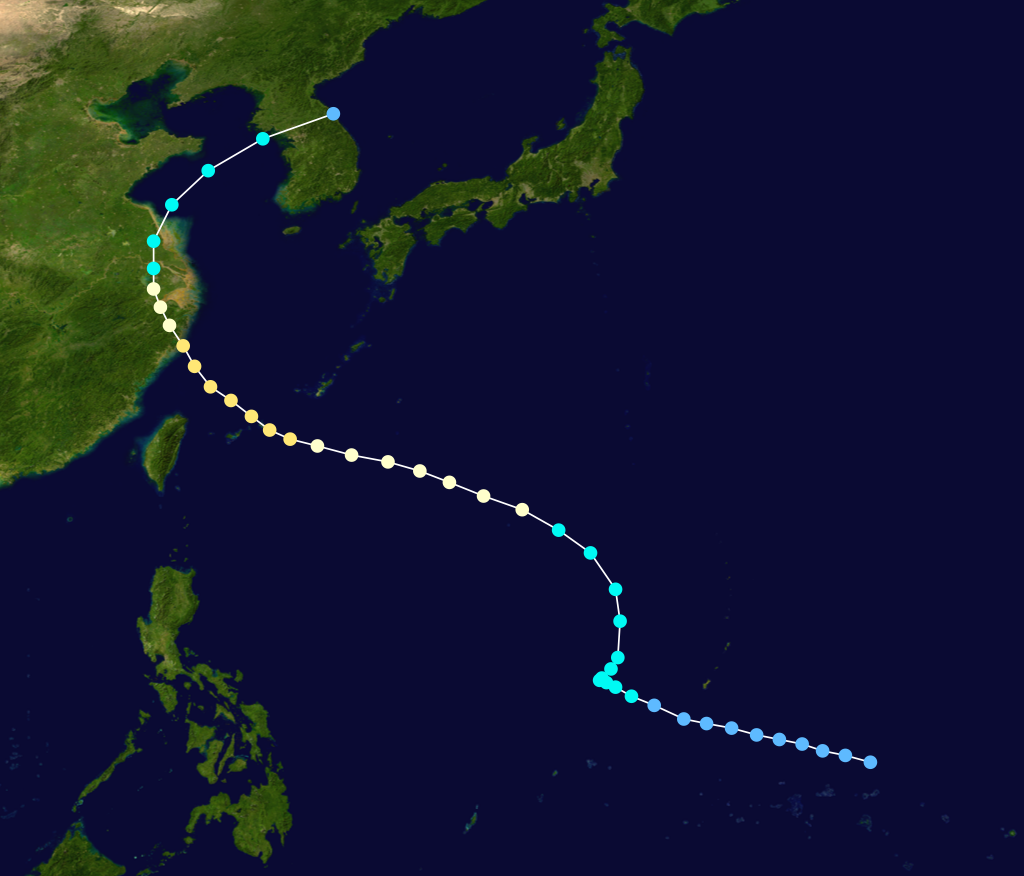
Map plotting the storm's track and intensity, according to the Saffir–Simpson scale Map key Saffir–Simpson scale Tropical depression (≤38 mph, ≤62 km/h) Tropical storm (39–73 mph, 63–118 km/h) Category 1 (74–95 mph, 119–153 km/h) Category 2 (96–110 mph, 154–177 km/h) Category 3 (111–129 mph, 178–208 km/h) Category 4 (130–156 mph, 209–251 km/h) Category 5 (≥157 mph, ≥252 km/h) Unknown Storm type Tropical cyclone Subtropical cyclone Extratropical cyclone, remnant low, tropical disturbance, or monsoon depression

The tropical disturbance which would eventually intensify to become Typhoon Abe was first noted by the Joint Typhoon Warning Center (JTWC) in a Significant Tropical Weather Advisory as an area of persistent atmospheric convection on August 23 at 01:00 UTC. (Note: The Joint Typhoon Warning Center is a joint United States Navy – United States Air Force task force that issues tropical cyclone warnings for the western Pacific Ocean and other regions.) Located near the end of what the JTWC considered to be "an active monsoon trough", the initial minimum sea-level pressure was estimated to be approximately 1,007 millibars (1,007 hPa; 29.74 inHg). Following this mention, the disturbance tracked in a mostly west-northwestward direction, traveling beneath a subtropical ridge, with a Tropical Cyclone Formation Alert being issued at 06:00 UTC based on the improving state of the low.

Following an increase in the storm's central convection, the JTWC determined at 00:00 UTC August 24 that it had intensified into a tropical storm which it assigned the designation 15W, and the Japan Meteorological Agency (JMA) began to monitor the system six hours later. (Note: The Japan Meteorological Agency is the official Regional Specialized Meteorological Center for the western Pacific Ocean.) The JMA upgraded the system to a tropical storm on its scale at 00:00 UTC August 25, and by the time twelve hours had passed, a strong surge in the monsoon westerlies had started to develop to the south of the storm's convective area, slowing its westward movement. After enhanced convection associated with the surge on the east side of Abe's main convective cloud mass wrapped around the north, the storm's center of circulation reorganized to the north between the competing convective masses. At 06:00 UTC August 27, the JMA upgraded Abe to a severe tropical storm with winds of 95 km/h (60 mph), and as a ragged eye developed in the storm, the JTWC upgraded Abe to typhoon status six hours later. Late on August 28, the JMA upgraded Abe to a typhoon on its scale, with ten-minute sustained winds of 120 km/h (75 mph).

Following the monsoon surge, Abe returned to its original west-northwestward track, further intensifying to become a Category 2-equivalent typhoon at 12:00 UTC on August 29. A weakness appeared in the subtropical ridge in association with a short-wave trough, and Typhoon Abe recurved through this weakness, taking it along the coast of China. Prior to making landfall, Abe attained a minimum atmospheric pressure of 955 millibars (hPa; 28.20 inHg) on August 29 at 18:00 UTC as determined by the JMA. It was found by the JTWC that Abe's one-minute sustained winds peaked at 165 km/h (105 mph) at 00:00 UTC August 30, and the JMA determined that its ten-minute sustained winds peaked at 140 km/h (85 mph) at 18:00 UTC on August 29. As a direct result of this interaction with land, Abe weakened to a tropical storm at 12:00 UTC on August 31, entering the Yellow Sea and crossing South Korea in the 30 hours that followed. It was determined at 18:00 UTC on September 1 that the storm had transitioned into an extratropical cyclone. The JTWC ceased tracking the system at 06:00 UTC September 2, and the JMA followed suit 36 hours later.

== Impacts ==
In the Philippines where Abe was known by the PAGASA name "Iliang", (Note: The Philippine Atmospheric, Geophysical and Astronomical Services Administration (PAGASA) independently names storms within its area of responsibility which is approximately 115°E to 135°E and 5°N to 25°N.) as a result of flooding and landslides caused by Abe, about 150 homes were washed away along Dalton Pass, leaving 1,500 people without homes and an additional 85 people dead. Rainfall-induced landslides ravaged areas previously damaged by an earthquake a month earlier, with landslide-caused fatalities totaling 32 in the Philippine provinces of Benguet, Nueva Ecija, and Nueva Vizcaya, Significant flooding in Luzon resulted in the deaths of 12 people in Manila, and Philippine Airlines responded by suspending domestic air services. In response to flooding caused by Typhoon Abe and Typhoon Becky in the Philippines, President of the Philippines Corazon Aquino issued a proclamation declaring the existence of a state of public calamity for affected areas of the country.

Parts of Okinawa Prefecture in Japan experienced high winds and heavy rainfall as Typhoon Abe passed nearby. Precipitation totals as high as 306 mm (12.0 in) and winds of 115 km/h (72 mph) were recorded in Ohara, and total forestry losses for Ishigaki totaled ¥500,000 yen (JPY, $3,000 USD). Some parts of Ishigaki experienced a suspension of their water supply, and about 800 households experienced power failures. Hundreds of millions of yen in agricultural losses, especially to sugar cane, occurred due to the typhoon, totaling ¥878.53 million yen (JPY, $6.0882 million USD), and losses in the water industry totaled an additional ¥12.02 million yen (JPY, $8,330 USD). The area also experienced airline flight cancellations, leaving thousands stranded while the storm passed. One person was drawn out to sea after winds of up to 110 km/h (70 mph) and high waves affected the coast.

In Taiwan, one person was killed and six others were injured as Typhoon Abe traveled across the East China Sea. Approximately 70,000 households had their supply of electricity cut off, and floods and landslides occurred as a result of heavy rainfall.

Early on August 31, Typhoon Abe made landfall over Zhejiang Province in China approximately 250–270 km (160–170 mi) south of Shanghai. In Zhejiang, where Abe was reportedly "the worst typhoon to hit the province in 34 years", casualties of the storm numbered in the hundreds, with 65 people rendered dead, 839 wounded, and an additional 45 reported missing. Significant flooding affected vast swaths of farmland and stranded about 660,000 people. Approximately a quarter of the province's population, about ten million people, was affected by the storm, which left 41,000 people without their homes and brought about the collapse of 21,800 houses. Additionally, about 1,000 ships at sea were destroyed, and the combined direct economic losses which resulted from Abe were about ¥3.5 billion yuan (RMB, 741.5–743 million USD). (Note: All damage totals are in 1990 values of their respective currencies.) The adjacent province of Jiangsu also experienced significant impacts; 23 people died and hundreds of others were injured as a result of the storm. Houses suffered serious impacts, with 80,000 destroyed and 120,000 damaged. Over 1.34 million hectares of fields were flooded. Three people were killed and 46 were injured in Shanghai, and a suburban area experienced a tornado. Altogether, an estimated 108 people were killed in China.

Abe brought heavy rain and gale-force winds to South Korea prior to transitioning to an extratropical cyclone near the east coast of the peninsula.

== See also ==
- Typhoon Saomai
- Typhoon Chan-hom (2015)
