= Typhoon Isa =

Pacific typhoon in 1997

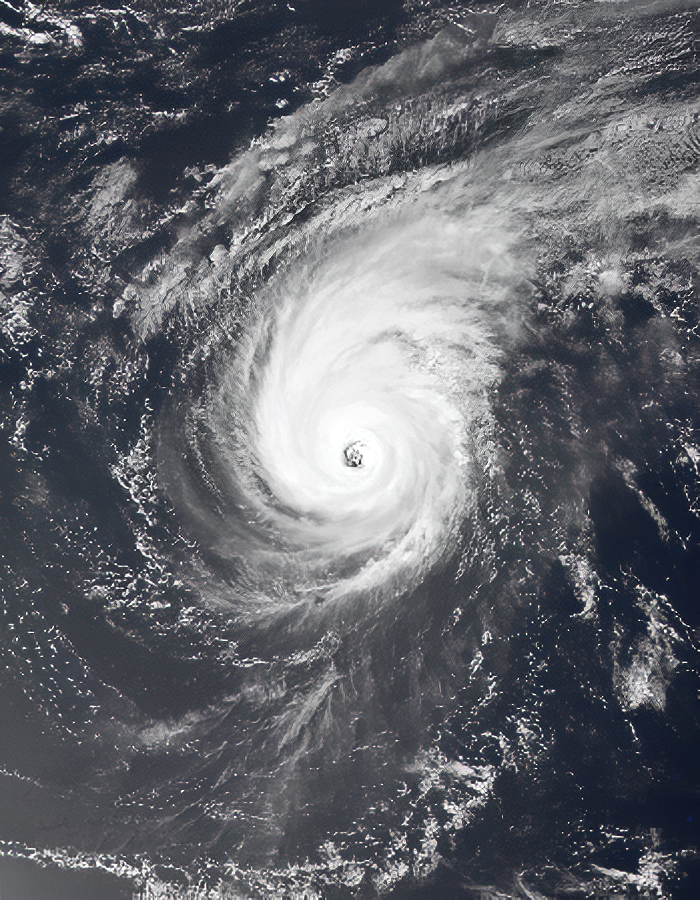
- Typhoon Isa at peak intensity on April 20

Meteorological history
- Formed: April 12, 1997
- Extratropical: April 23, 1997
- Dissipated: April 24, 1997

Very strong typhoon
- 10-minute sustained (JMA)
- Highest winds: 155 km/h (100 mph)
- Lowest pressure: 930 hPa (mbar); 27.46 inHg

Category 5-equivalent super typhoon
- 1-minute sustained (SSHWS/JTWC)
- Highest winds: 270 km/h (165 mph)
- Lowest pressure: 892 hPa (mbar); 26.34 inHg

Overall effects
- Fatalities: None
- Damage: $1 million
- Areas affected: Pohnpei, Guam, Rota
- IBTrACS
- Part of the 1997 Pacific typhoon season

Typhoon Isa was the first of a record eleven super typhoons to occur during the 1997 Pacific typhoon season. The second tropical cyclone of the season, Isa developed from a disturbance in the monsoon trough near the Caroline Islands on April 12. It moved erratically at first, though after attaining tropical storm status it curved westward due to the subtropical ridge to its north. Isa very gradually intensified, and on April 20 the typhoon reached peak 1-min winds of 270 km/h (170 mph), as reported by the Joint Typhoon Warning Center; Japan Meteorological Agency reported maximum 10-min winds of 155 km/h (95 mph). After turning northward, it accelerated to the northeast, and merged with a larger extratropical cyclone on April 24.

Early in its duration, Isa caused light rainfall and moderate winds on Pohnpei. Later, a stationary rainband from the typhoon dropped heavy precipitation on Guam during its dry season. Damage in the Guam National Weather Service area of responsibility totaled $1 million (1997 USD, 2.01 million 2025 USD), the majority of it from crop damage. No deaths were reported.

== Meteorological history ==
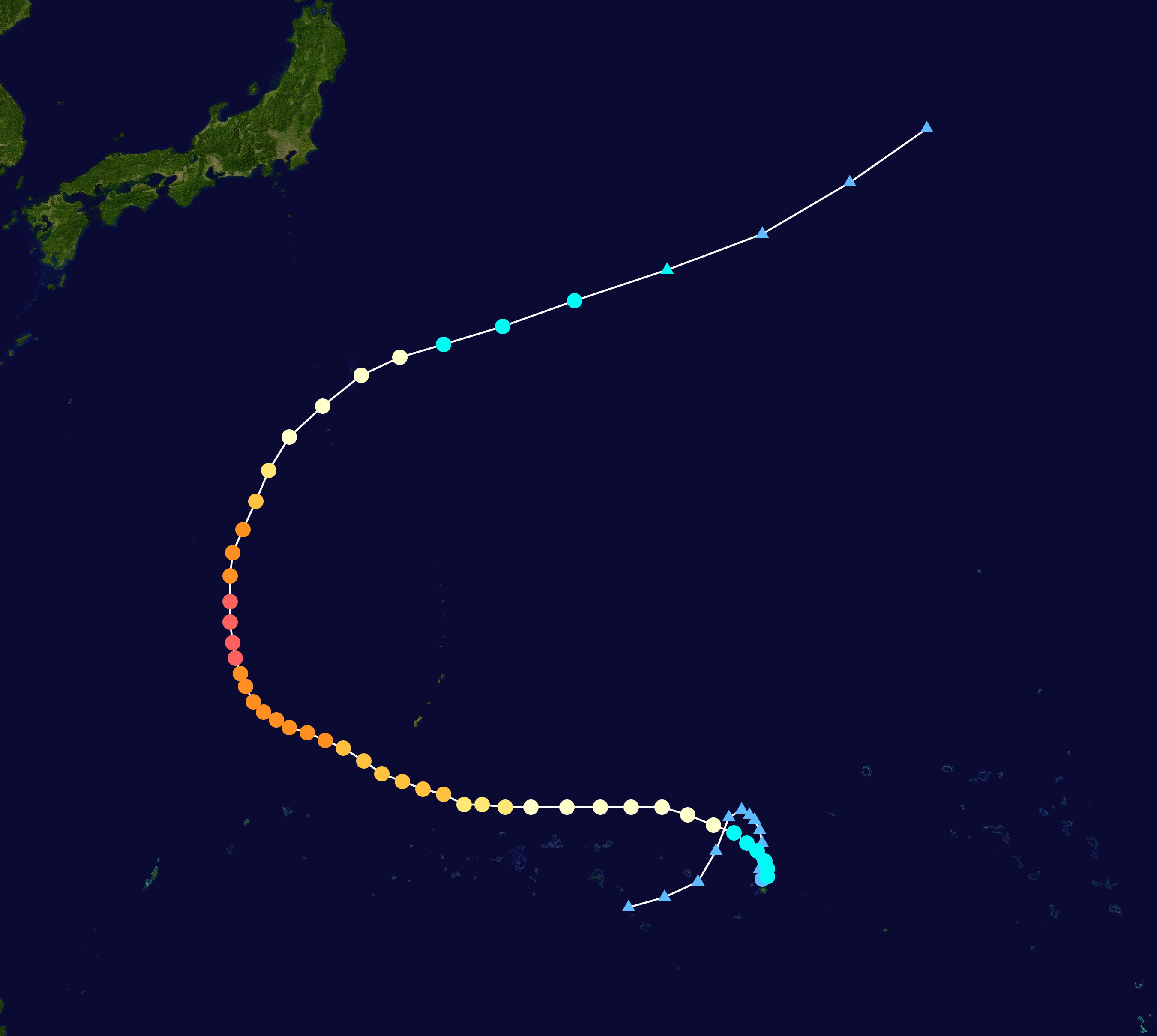
Map plotting the storm's track and intensity, according to the Saffir–Simpson scale Map key Saffir–Simpson scale Tropical depression (≤38 mph, ≤62 km/h) Tropical storm (39–73 mph, 63–118 km/h) Category 1 (74–95 mph, 119–153 km/h) Category 2 (96–110 mph, 154–177 km/h) Category 3 (111–129 mph, 178–208 km/h) Category 4 (130–156 mph, 209–251 km/h) Category 5 (≥157 mph, ≥252 km/h) Unknown Storm type Tropical cyclone Subtropical cyclone Extratropical cyclone, remnant low, tropical disturbance, or monsoon depression

In early April, the monsoon trough established itself across Micronesia near the equator. An area of convection within the trough developed in the Caroline Islands on April 9, and resembled the characteristics of a monsoon depression. Shortly thereafter, a large, yet weak low-level circulation formed within the system. The system drifted erratically for several days as it slowly organized; the system underwent several cycles of developing and losing convection. On April 11, the system maintained a persistent area of well-organized deep convection, and subsequent to an increase in upper-level outflow, the Joint Typhoon Warning Center (JTWC) classified the system as Tropical Depression 02W at 1800 UTC on April 11. Strong influence from the monsoonal westerlies left the depression drifting and slowly executing a loop to the northwest. Based on sufficient satellite classifications, JTWC upgraded the depression to Tropical Storm Isa early on April 12 while it was located 105 km (65 mi) of Pohnpei. The Japan Meteorological Agency (JMA) simultaneously classified the system as a tropical depression and upgraded it to a tropical storm early on April 13.

With the subtropical ridge to its north, Isa tracked to the north and gradually curved to the west. It slowly intensified, due to it being a large tropical cyclone, and late on April 13 JTWC upgraded the storm to typhoon status; at the same time, JMA continued to assess Isa as a minimal tropical storm, and did not upgrade it to a typhoon until April 16. Isa maintained a nearly due-westward movement, although tropical cyclone prediction models anticipated a quick turn to the north. The JTWC recognized the northward model bias, which was described as under-analyzing the strength of the subtropical ridge. By April 16, the typhoon attained the equivalence of a Category 3 tropical cyclone on the Saffir-Simpson Hurricane Scale, and despite a potential threat to Guam the typhoon remained 260 km (160 mi) south of the island. It gradually curved to the north, and on April 20 JTWC classified Super Typhoon Isa as reaching peak 1-min winds of 270 km/h (170 mph). At this point, Isa became an annular typhoon, with a large eye and a lack of spiralform rainbands, while moving nearly due northward, through a weakness in the subtropical ridge. Simultaneously, JMA assessed the typhoon as attaining peak 10-min winds of 155 km/h (95 mph).

Shortly after peaking in intensity, Isa began to weaken, and by April 21 it dropped below "super typhoon" status. It accelerated to the northeast under the flow of the mid-latitudes, and the typhoon weakened more rapidly; JMA downgraded Isa to a tropical storm on April 22, which was followed suit by the JTWC the next day as upper-level wind shear increased. At 0600 UTC on April 23, the JTWC issued the last advisory on the system, and the next day JMA classified Isa dissipated as it became absorbed by a cloud band from a large extratropical cyclone to the east of Japan.

== Impact ==
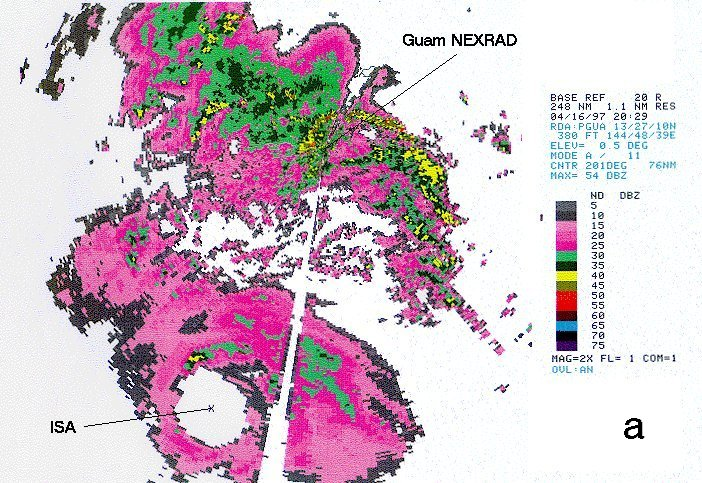
Typhoon Isa visible from Guam NEXRAD

Isa first affected Pohnpei as a tropical storm on April 12. While passing near the island, the storm produced moderate winds across the island, peaking at 95 km/h (60 mph). The winds downed several trees and tree limbs which destroyed 40% of the island's power lines. A few buildings reported roof damage. About 15% of the crops on Pohnpei were damaged, including losses to the banana and breadfruit crops. After the passage of the typhoon, President of the Federated States of Micronesia Jacob Nena declared Pohnpei as a major disaster area due to the damage from Typhoon Isa and subsequent flooding; on April 20 heavy rainfall caused widespread mudslides and 19 fatalities on the island, though they were not related to Isa.

In Guam, the threat of Typhoon Isa postponed a flight from Guam to Honolulu, Hawaii for 48 hours. The flight was the last in Operation Pacific Haven, which was a multimillion-dollar humanitarian effort to transport more than 6,600 Kurds in a political asylum to the mainland of the United States. The threat of the typhoon also canceled the first round of the Omega Tour golf event, which was the second professional golf tournament in the island's history. Though Typhoon Isa passed well to the south of Guam, one of its outer rainbands stalled across the island, which dropped heavy rainfall of 15–25 cm (6–10 in) across the island. The rainfall was welcome as it occurred during the dry season, and largely contributed to rainfall at the Guam International Airport being 45% above normal from the period between January through April. The rainband also produced wind gusts that reached 86 km/h (53 mph) at the island's Naval Air Station; the winds resulted in sporadic power outages across the island. The typhoon caused some light damage to buildings, particularly on the south side of the island. The combination of winds and sea salt caused damage to the island's tomato, okra, cucumber, and soybean crops.

Typhoon Isa later dropped light rainfall on the island of Rota. Across its path, damage from the storm totaled over $1 million (1997 USD, $2.01 million 2025 USD). No deaths or injuries were reported.

== See also ==
- List of notable tropical cyclones
- Typhoon Mitag (2002)
- Typhoon Maysak (2015)
- Typhoon Surigae (2021) - The strongest tropical cyclone in the Northern Hemisphere to form before May
