= Typhoon Surigae (2021) =

Pacific typhoon in 2021

Typhoon Surigae (Bising)
- Surigae nearing its peak intensity east of the Philippines on April 17

Meteorological history
- Formed: April 12, 2021
- Extratropical: April 24, 2021
- Dissipated: April 30, 2021

Violent typhoon
- 10-minute sustained (JMA)
- Highest winds: 220 km/h (140 mph)
- Lowest pressure: 895 hPa (mbar); 26.43 inHg

Category 5-equivalent super typhoon
- 1-minute sustained (SSHWS/JTWC)
- Highest winds: 315 km/h (195 mph)
- Lowest pressure: 882 hPa (mbar); 26.05 inHg

Overall effects
- Fatalities: 9 total
- Damage: $10.5 million (2021 USD)
- Areas affected: Caroline Islands, Sulawesi, Philippines, Taiwan
- IBTrACS
- Part of the 2021 Pacific typhoon season

Typhoon Surigae, known in the Philippines as Super Typhoon Bising, was the strongest Northern Hemisphere tropical cyclone to form in the first four months of the calendar year. The second named storm, first typhoon and first violent typhoon of the 2021 Pacific typhoon season, Surigae was the strongest tropical cyclone worldwide in 2021.

The storm originated from a low-pressure area south of the Micronesian island of Woleai. The low organized into a tropical depression on April 12. At 18:00 UTC that day, it strengthened into a tropical storm and was named Surigae by the Japan Meteorological Agency (JMA). Very favorable environmental conditions then allowed Surigae to begin a bout of rapid intensification after becoming a typhoon on April 15; by April 17, the storm reached its peak intensity with 10-minute sustained winds of 220 km/h (140 mph), (Note: The Japan Meteorological Agency uses 10-minute sustained winds, while the Joint Typhoon Warning Center uses 1-minute sustained winds. The conversion factor between the two is 1.14.) 1-minute sustained winds of 315 km/h (195 mph), and a minimum pressure of 895 hPa (26.4 inHg). Afterward, weakening outflow and an eyewall replacement cycle caused Surigae to gradually weaken as its track shifted north-northwestward in the Philippine Sea. Following the eyewall replacement cycle, Surigae became an annular tropical cyclone on April 19, and restrengthened slightly. On April 22, the storm began to rapidly weaken as it accelerated northwestward into unfavorable environmental conditions, transitioning into a subtropical storm the next day. The subtropical system subsequently underwent extratropical transition, which it completed by April 24. Three days later, Surigae's remnant explosively intensified into a bomb cyclone near the Aleutian Islands, attaining hurricane-force winds. Afterward, the system gradually weakened as it turned eastward, crossing the International Date Line on April 30 and fully dissipating that same day.

Upon Surigae's naming, watches and warnings were issued for the island of Yap in the Federated States of Micronesia and the islands of Koror and Kayangel in Palau as well. The typhoon left US$4.8 million in damage in Palau after cutting off power and water and destroying infrastructure. (Note: All monetary figures are in their 2021 values unless otherwise noted.) Later, warnings were raised for parts of the Philippines as the typhoon moved closer to the nation, with evacuations taking place in eastern regions of the Visayas. The Philippines was battered with heavy rainfall, flooding and strong winds as Surigae passed just offshore. Landslides displaced over 100,000 people in the Bicol Region. The cargo ship LCU Cebu Great Ocean ran aground in the southern Philippines. Overall, Surigae killed at least 10 people and left another eight missing, in addition to causing at least ₱272.8 million (US$5.67 million) in damage in the Philippines.

== Meteorological history ==
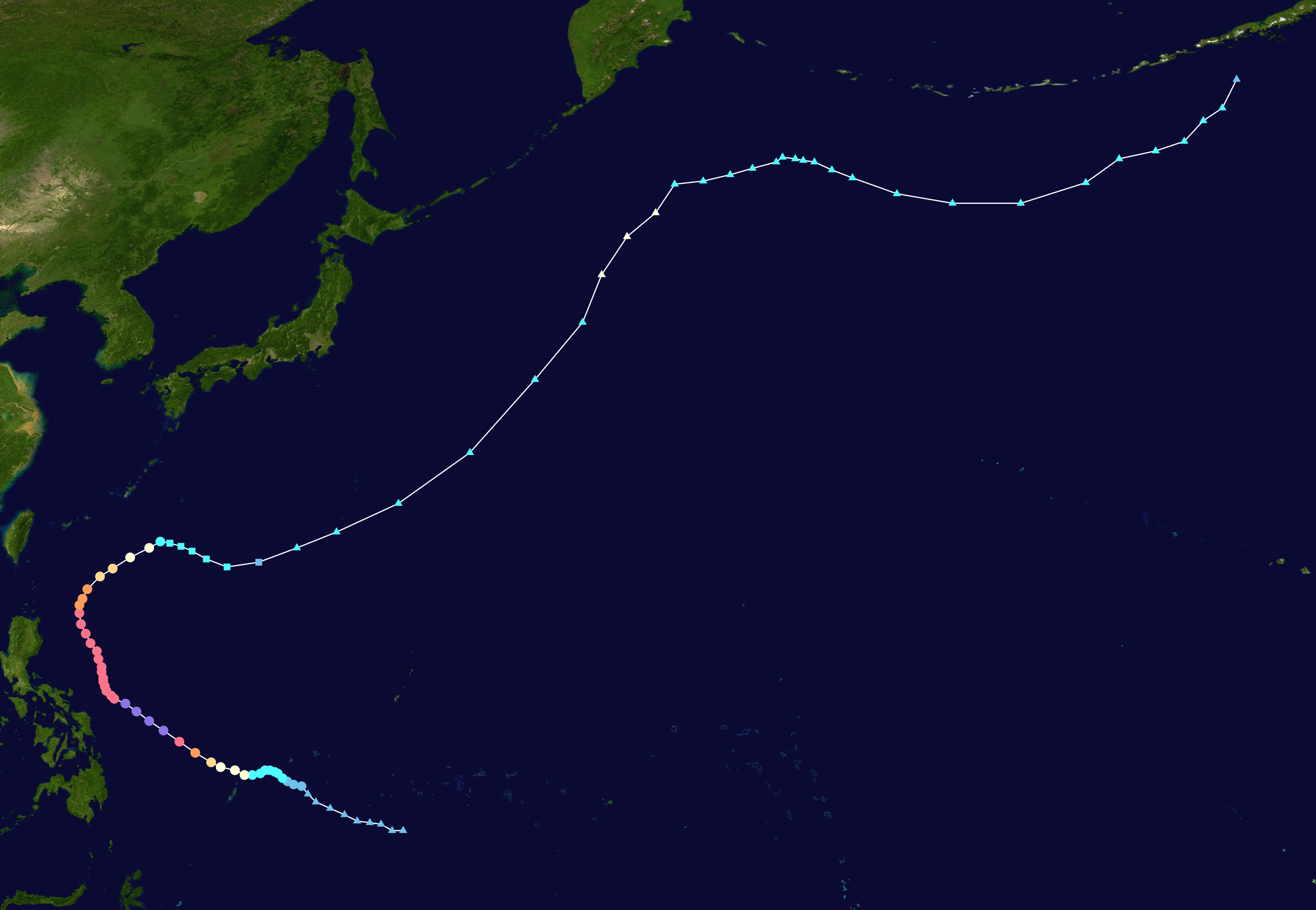
Map plotting the storm's track and intensity, according to the Saffir–Simpson scale Map key Saffir–Simpson scale Tropical depression (≤38 mph, ≤62 km/h) Tropical storm (39–73 mph, 63–118 km/h) Category 1 (74–95 mph, 119–153 km/h) Category 2 (96–110 mph, 154–177 km/h) Category 3 (111–129 mph, 178–208 km/h) Category 4 (130–156 mph, 209–251 km/h) Category 5 (≥157 mph, ≥252 km/h) Unknown Storm type Tropical cyclone Subtropical cyclone Extratropical cyclone, remnant low, tropical disturbance, or monsoon depression

During mid-April 2021, an area of atmospheric convection associated with a weak area of low pressure developed roughly 1,150 km (710 mi) south of Guam. By April 10, the disturbance had acquired nascent rainbands within an environment exhibiting low wind shear, warm sea surface temperatures (SSTs) between 28–29 °C (82–84 °F), and a well-established outflow, which was conducive for further tropical cyclogenesis. Showers and thunderstorms continued to emerge around the circulation embedded within the disturbance. The Japan Meteorological Agency (JMA) (Note: The Japan Meteorological Agency is the official Regional Specialized Meteorological Center for the western Pacific Ocean.) assessed the formation of a tropical depression near 5°N 143°E; at the time, the newly designated system was moving slowly west-northwest around the southern periphery of a subtropical ridge. Due to its anticipated track into Philippine waters, the Philippine Atmospheric, Geophysical and Astronomical Services Administration (PAGASA) also began issuing advisories on the tropical depression on April 12. The Joint Typhoon Warning Center (JTWC) (Note: The Joint Typhoon Warning Center is a joint United States Navy – United States Air Force task force that issues tropical cyclone warnings for the western Pacific Ocean and other regions.) issued a Tropical Cyclone Formation Alert (TCFA) later that day, projecting a high likelihood of a significant tropical cyclone developing. By April 13, the agency assessed the disturbance as a tropical depression.

Satellite loop of Typhoon Surigae when it was rapidly intensifying prior to its peak intensity while approaching the Philippines on April 17.

A strong rainband along the depression's northern semicircle became prominent and coalesced around a robust and developing central dense overcast. At 18:00 UTC on the same day, the JMA upgraded the system to a tropical storm and named it Surigae. (Note: The name Surigae (Korean: 수리개, [sʰuɾiɡɛ]) was contributed by North Korea and refers to the black kite (Milvus migrans) in the Hamgyŏng dialect.) Surigae was also upgraded to a tropical storm by the JTWC in the early hours of April 14, as the system progressed westward in the Philippine Sea. The storm continued to move slowly, remaining nearly stationary on April 14 – as it gradually intensified. Surigae's convective activity was initially displaced to the west of its center of circulation, though additional rainbands and thunderstorm development later covered the central vortex. On April 15, the JMA upgraded Surigae to a severe tropical storm as it moved closer to the island nation of Palau. A formative eye became apparent on microwave satellite imagery later that day.

By April 16, Surigae strengthened to a typhoon just north of Palau, making it the first typhoon of the 2021 Pacific typhoon season. The typhoon's convective activity had become tightly wound around its center, indicating additional strengthening. On April 16 at 03:00 UTC, the Philippine Atmospheric, Geophysical and Astronomical Services Administration (PAGASA) gave the storm the local name Bising as it entered the Philippine Area of Responsibility. The system's eye became apparent through the central overcast, preceding a period of rapid intensification as Surigae progressed west-northwestward through a conducive environment. Surigae's central dense overcast became colder and better-organized, with a well-defined ring of very cold cloud tops encircling a 26 km (16 mi) diameter eye. Concurrently, an approaching trough produced a gap in the subtropical ridge of high pressure to the north, causing Surigae to slowly curve northwest as it quickly strengthened.

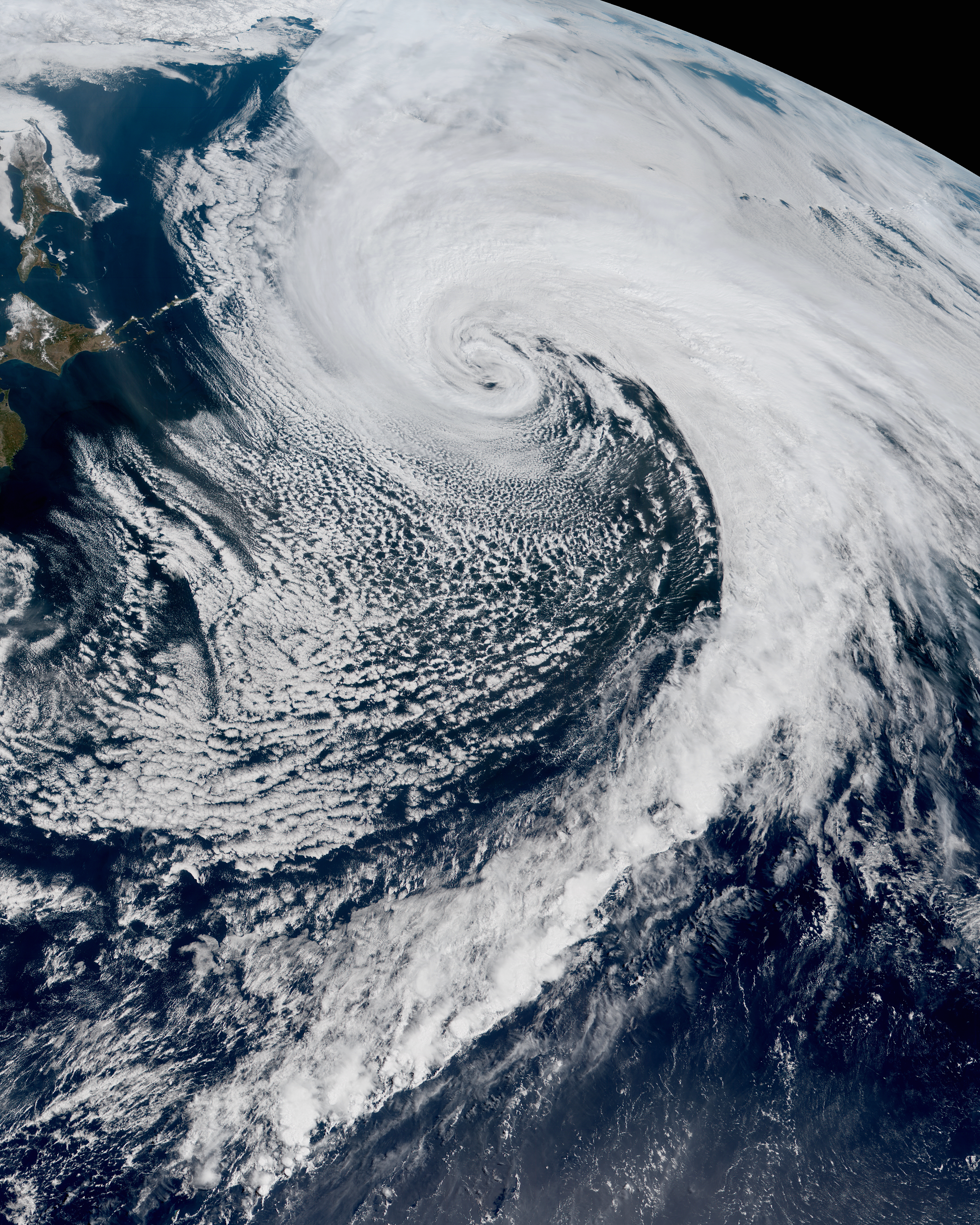
Surigae as a powerful extratropical cyclone over the northwest Pacific, early on April 27

On April 17, the JMA determined via the Dvorak technique that Surigae's barometric pressure had rapidly fallen to 895 hPa (mbar; 26.43 inHg), as the storm reached its peak intensity. Its 10-minute maximum sustained winds reached 220 km/h (135 mph) according to the JMA, while one-minute maximum sustained winds reached 315 km/h (195 mph) according to the JTWC, making it equivalent to a Category 5 violent typhoon on the Saffir–Simpson scale (SSHWS); (Note: A super typhoon is an unofficial category used by the Joint Typhoon Warning Center (JTWC) for a typhoon with winds of at least 240 km/h (150 mph).) the peak 1-minute sustained winds were also higher for the time of year than any previous typhoon on record. The JTWC also estimated a minimum central pressure of 882 hPa (mbar; 26.05 inHg) for Surigae at the time. Later that day, Surigae began an eyewall replacement cycle causing its eye to become less apparent on satellite imagery and its winds to slightly diminish. The trough to Surigae's north also impeded the typhoon's outflow, resulting in a decrease in environmental favorability for further intensification. On April 18, Surigae finished its eyewall replacement cycle; Surigae acquired annular characteristics, bearing a symmetrical appearance and a large eye, which was largely surrounded by one large rainband, by the next day.

By April 20, the prevalence of nearby dry air and upwelling of cold waters beneath the slow-moving typhoon caused its winds to decrease further. Some reorganization occurred when Surigae began to move north and away from the upwelled waters, with its large eye becoming less ragged; however, additional entrainment of dry air originating from the mid-troposphere over Luzon caused Surigae's structure to degrade further on April 21. Surigae turned northeast away from the Philippines later that day and weakened further, upon entering an environment with strong westerly winds in the upper troposphere. The once large and clear eye disappeared on April 22, leaving behind an increasingly-disheveled cluster of weakening showers and thunderstorms. Soon afterward, all of Surigae's remaining convection was sheared to the east, as the storm moved over cooler waters. As most of the remaining thunderstorms had dissipated, Surigae transitioned into a subtropical cyclone on April 23 due to interacting with an upper-level atmospheric trough as Surigae traversed a cold oceanic eddy. Surigae began to undergo extratropical transition, a process it completed late on April 24, at which time the JTWC issued their final advisory on the system. The JMA declared that Surigae had become extratropical a few hours later.

As an extratropical cyclone, Surigae underwent explosive cyclogenesis on April 26, with its central pressure falling 44 hPa (mbar; 1.3 inHg) within 24 hours, while rapidly tracking northeastward. While located to the east of Hokkaido, the system's ten-minute maximum sustained winds reached 130 km/h (80 mph) at 18:00 UTC that day, and its central pressure bottomed out at 944 hPa (mbar; 27.88 inHg) six hours later. Late on April 27, Surigae's remnant started to weaken while turning eastward. The next day, the system's forward motion significantly slowed down. On April 30, Surigae underwent a center reformation, with the original center of low pressure dissipating, and a new low-pressure center forming shortly afterward, which quickly dominated the system.

== Preparations ==
=== Micronesia and Palau ===
Starting on April 14, the National Weather Service office in Tiyan, Guam began issuing advisories across the Federated States of Micronesia and Palau, with tropical storm watches raised across Yap and Ngulu Atoll of Yap State; both watches were upgraded to warnings the same day as Surigae neared Ngulu Atoll. In addition, Kayangel and Koror in Palau received a tropical storm watch. The warning for Yap was then canceled on April 15. That same day, the watches for Kayangel and Koror were upgraded to warnings. After Surigae had become a typhoon the following day, a typhoon warning was issued for Kayangel. All advisories were canceled on April 17 as Surigae moved away from Palau. In Palau, 350 people were in shelters, including 18 public schools.

=== Philippines ===
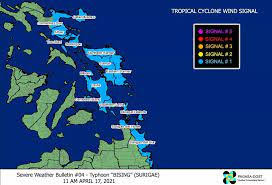
Surigae TCWS PSWS (Bising)

As Surigae entered the Philippine Area of Responsibility, the PAGASA began issuing weather bulletins for the nearby storm. Initial forecasts by the agency suggested that the storm was less likely to make landfall over Luzon, and expected the storm to re-curve away from the Philippines. On April 16, the Department of Transportation of the Philippines suspended all air and land travel to and from Visayas and Mindanao. In the ensuing travel suspension, 2,507 individuals and 61 sea vessels were stranded in ports throughout the country. Wave heights as high as 4.5 m (15 ft) were forecast near the eastern coasts of Visayas and Mindanao. In order to avoid agricultural losses, Secretary William Dar of the Department of Agriculture encouraged farmers in the Bicol and Eastern Visayas regions to harvest their crops and for fishermen to refrain from fishing due to worsening oceanic conditions. At 15:00 UTC (23:00 PHT), the PAGASA began issuing Tropical Cyclone Wind Signal (TCWS) #1 for areas in Eastern Visayas and the Caraga Region, as well as for portions of Luzon six hours later.

On April 17, TCWS #2 was issued for Catanduanes and the entire island of Samar. Flood advisories were also issued by the PAGASA for three regions in Visayas and Mindanao. In preparation for the intense rains, the National Telecommunications Commission ordered telecommunications companies to prepare facilities in forecasted affected areas, including free calling and charging stations. As early as April 17, preemptive evacuation began in the Bicol Region and the Samar province, and by April 21, 169,072 people were evacuated in the Cagayan Valley, Bicol Region, Eastern Visayas, and Caraga. Flights in Daniel Z. Romualdez Airport and all Tacloban Airports were cancelled on April 18, and other domestic flights were also cancelled on the same day. In addition, 10 domestic flights elsewhere were also cancelled that day. Schools and work activities were suspended in the Bicol Region till April 20. The Filipino government prepared ₱1.5 billion (US$31.05 million) worth of standby funds for disaster response.

== Impact ==
=== Micronesia and Palau ===
Locally heavy rainfall occurred in parts of Palau and Yap for several days. Surigae brought sustained winds of up to 80 km/h (50 mph) and gusts up to 135 km/h (84 mph) to Palau, causing power outages across the island. Large swells from the developing storm brought coastal flooding to Koror and Yap. Residents in those areas were advised to avoid reef lines in the north and west, and to take caution on beaches due to rip currents and large waves. Surigae was the closest typhoon to pass near the island of Palau since Typhoon Haiyan. Restaurants, sporting events and other services were closed in Palau as Surigae approached closer– yet schools remained open. Schools were not suspended until power had been cut off across much of the entire country. Water and cellular services were also downed. 125 homes across the country were destroyed, while at least 1,500 sustained minor damage. The entire population of Palau, consisting of approximately 18,008 people, was impacted by the typhoon. At least US$2 million worth of infrastructure alone was damaged in Palau. The total amount of damage across health, infrastructure, education, food, communication, utilities and other sectors was assessed at US$4.8 million. President of Palau Surangel Whipps Jr. issued a national state of emergency on April 18. The United States Agency for International Development (USAID) provided US$100,000 for immediate assistance to support those affected. In Guam, emergency supplies were being prepared and donated to communities in need in Palau.

=== Philippines ===
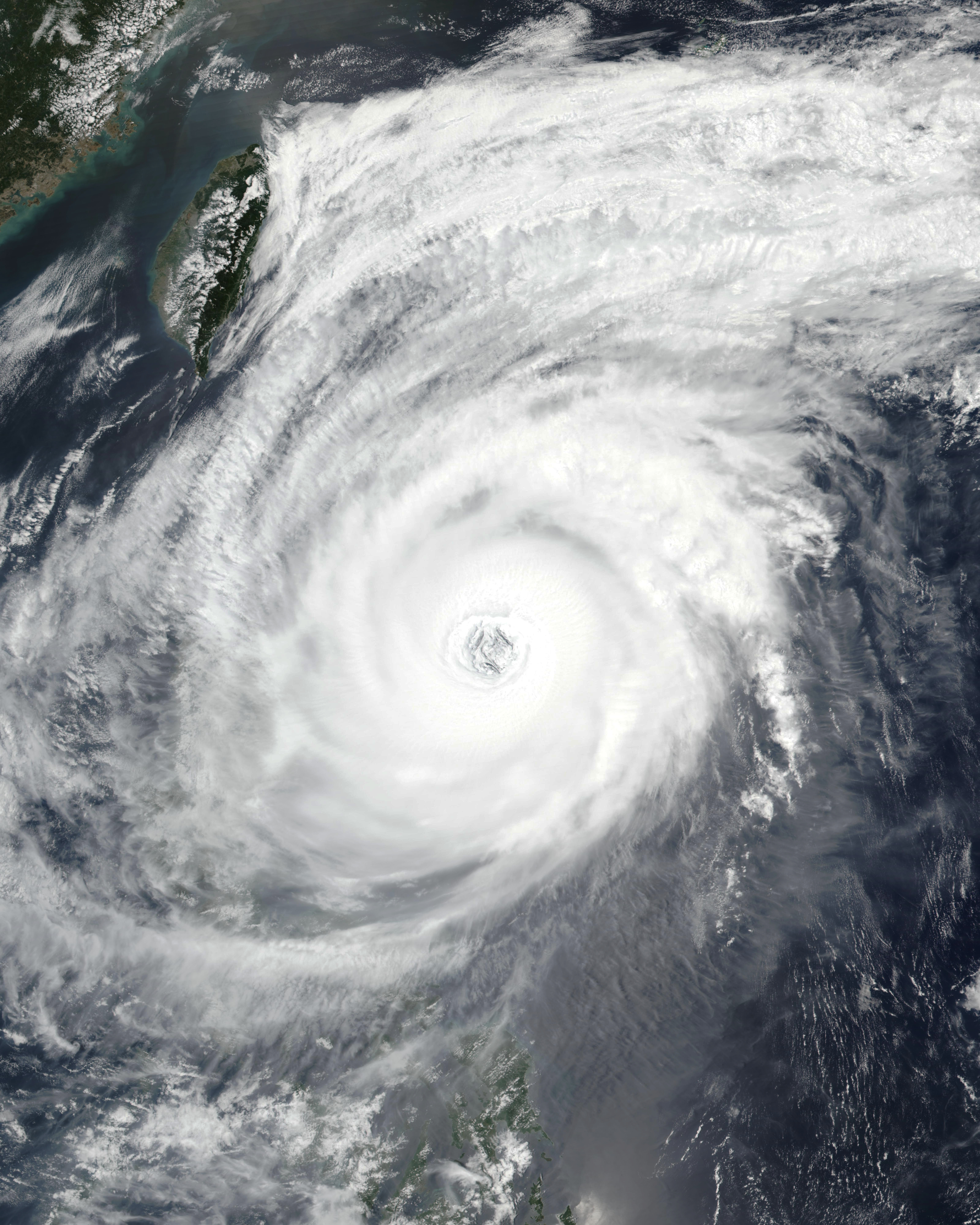
Typhoon Surigae as a Category 4-equivalent typhoon to the east of the Philippines on April 21. Surigae was also displaying annular characteristics at the time.

Five people in a boat were rescued off the coast of Pujada Bay due to dangerous sea conditions produced by Surigae. Another boat with two fishermen aboard capsized during midnight on its way to Bantayan Island, with both of two fishermen having to swim back to shore. On April 19, Surigae forced the cargo ship LCU Cebu Great Ocean, carrying twenty crew members and nickel ore, to run aground on the coast of the Province of Surigao del Norte, in the southern Philippines. At least six of the crew members were found dead, while seven were rescued. Heavy rain from the outer bands of Surigae battered Eastern Visayas and the Bicol Region as it passed around 345 km (215 mi) to the east of Catanduanes. Widespread rainfall totals of up to 200–300 millimetres (8–12 in) occurred in the eastern Philippines, while 511 millimetres (20.13 in) of rain fell in Virac, Catanduanes and surrounding areas. A funnel cloud was also briefly reported in Camarines Sur. Twenty-two barangays were flooded in Eastern Visayas, and in the municipality of Jipapad, flooding reached 4 metres (13 ft). Power interruptions were experienced in Central Visayas, Eastern Visayas and in Eastern Samar, power was interrupted for the whole province. 109,815 people were displaced by flooding and landslides in the Bicol Region.

Ten deaths were reported due to the typhoon. One person in Southern Leyte and another in Cebu died due to fallen coconut trees. Six crew members of the LCU Cebu Great Ocean were found dead after the ship ran aground in the southern Philippines. Another person remains missing in Northern Samar. 13 others were injured. A total of 3,385 houses were damaged in the Bicol Region, Eastern Visayas and Caraga, with 158 totally destroyed. Agricultural damage in the Bicol Region and Eastern Visayas reached ₱261.9 million (US$5.43 million), while infrastructural damage totaled ₱10.87 million (US$226,000). 63 cities experienced power interruptions; however, power was restored in 54 of those cities.

Following the passage of Surigae, the Department of Social Welfare and Development (DSWD) and local government units provided assistance worth approximately ₱6.52 million (US$135,000) to those affected in Cagayan Valley, the Bicol Region and the Eastern Visayas. Schools and workplaces fully reopened by April 20.

=== Elsewhere ===
The influence of Surigae caused gusts in North Sulawesi that reached 23 mph (37 km/h). Large waves of 13.1–19.8 feet (4.0–6.0 m) affected the coastal waters of the Sitaro Islands Regency, Sangihe Islands Regency, the Talaud Islands and the northern Molucca Sea. Surigae made its closest approach to Taiwan on April 22. The typhoon's outer bands brought much-needed rainfall to central Taiwan, which was going through its worst drought in 56 years. There were also reports of hail. Large waves up to 4.2 m (14 ft) tall generated by Surigae were recorded along Taiwan's east coast on April 21.

== See also ==
- Weather of 2021
- Tropical cyclones in 2021
- Other tropical cyclones named Bising
- Typhoon Amy (1971) – another early-season typhoon that attained a similar intensity
- Typhoon Marie (1976) – another strong April typhoon that took a similar track, impacted Palau and Eastern Philippines
- Typhoon Alice (1979) – the most intense January tropical cyclone on record in the Western Pacific basin
- Typhoon Mitag (2002) – another strong early-season typhoon that took a somewhat similar path
- Typhoon Songda (2011) – took a similar track and went on to impact Japan
- Typhoon Maysak (2015) – the most powerful typhoon in the basin to form before April, affected similar areas.
- Typhoon Wutip (2019) – strongest February typhoon on record
- Typhoon Goni (2020) – another extremely powerful typhoon that affected Philippines around 6 months before Surigae.
- Typhoon Mawar (2023) – strongest May typhoon on record
- Typhoon Sinlaku (2026) – Another April violent typhoon of very similar intensity
