= Typhoon Maysak (2015) =

Pacific typhoon in 2015

Typhoon Maysak (Chedeng)
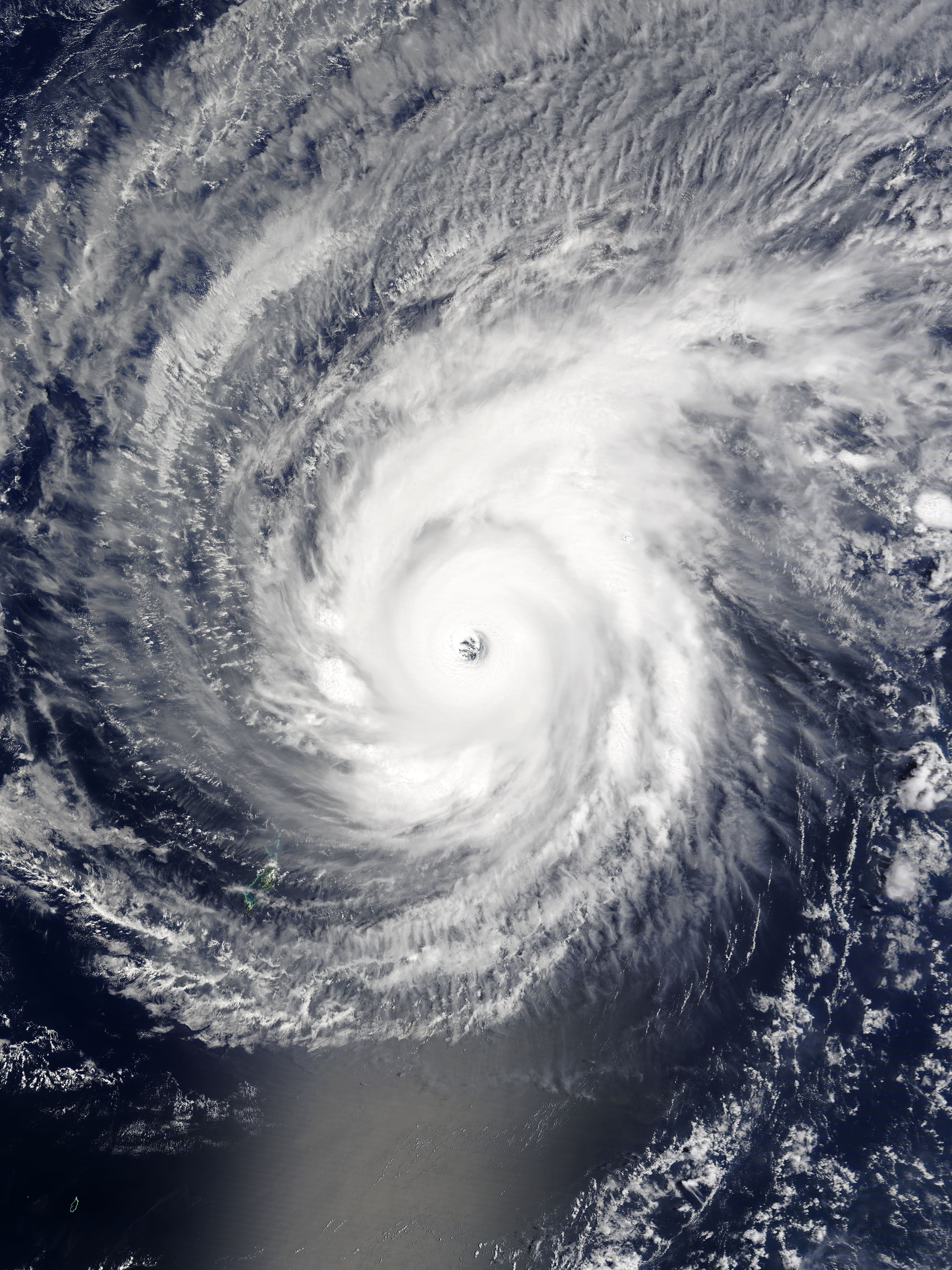
- Maysak at peak intensity on April 1

Meteorological history
- Formed: March 26, 2015
- Dissipated: April 7, 2015

Violent typhoon
- 10-minute sustained (JMA)
- Highest winds: 195 km/h (120 mph)
- Lowest pressure: 910 hPa (mbar); 26.87 inHg

Category 5-equivalent super typhoon
- 1-minute sustained (SSHWS/JTWC)
- Highest winds: 280 km/h (175 mph)
- Lowest pressure: 911 hPa (mbar); 26.90 inHg

Overall effects
- Fatalities: 5 direct
- Damage: $8.5 million (2015 USD)
- Areas affected: Federated States of Micronesia, Philippines
- IBTrACS
- Part of the 2015 Pacific typhoon season

Typhoon Maysak, known in the Philippines as Typhoon Chedeng, was the most powerful pre-April tropical cyclone on record in the Northwestern Pacific Ocean. The fourth named storm of the 2015 Pacific typhoon season, Maysak originated as a tropical depression on March 26. The next day, the Japan Meteorological Agency (JMA) upgraded the depression to a tropical storm and assigned it the name Maysak. According to the JMA, Maysak became the second typhoon of the year on March 28. The typhoon underwent explosive intensification into a Category 5 super typhoon on March 31, passing near the islands of Chuuk and Yap in the Federated States of Micronesia. After maintaining that intensity for 18 hours, Maysak weakened, made landfall over the Philippine island of Luzon as a minimal tropical storm, and dissipated shortly afterwards.

Maysak affected Yap and Chuuk in the Federated States of Micronesia, as well as the Philippines. The storm was responsible for four deaths in the Federated States of Micronesia alongside 10 injuries. Damage was estimated at $8.5 million (2015 USD). Estimates from the Red Cross suggested that there were 5,000 people in desperate need of food, water and shelter, and needed emergency assistance. Pacific Mission Aviation administrator Melinda Espinosa said "Most concrete structures withstood the fury but everything else was damaged." Later, the storm struck the Philippines, causing minimal damage.

== Meteorological history ==
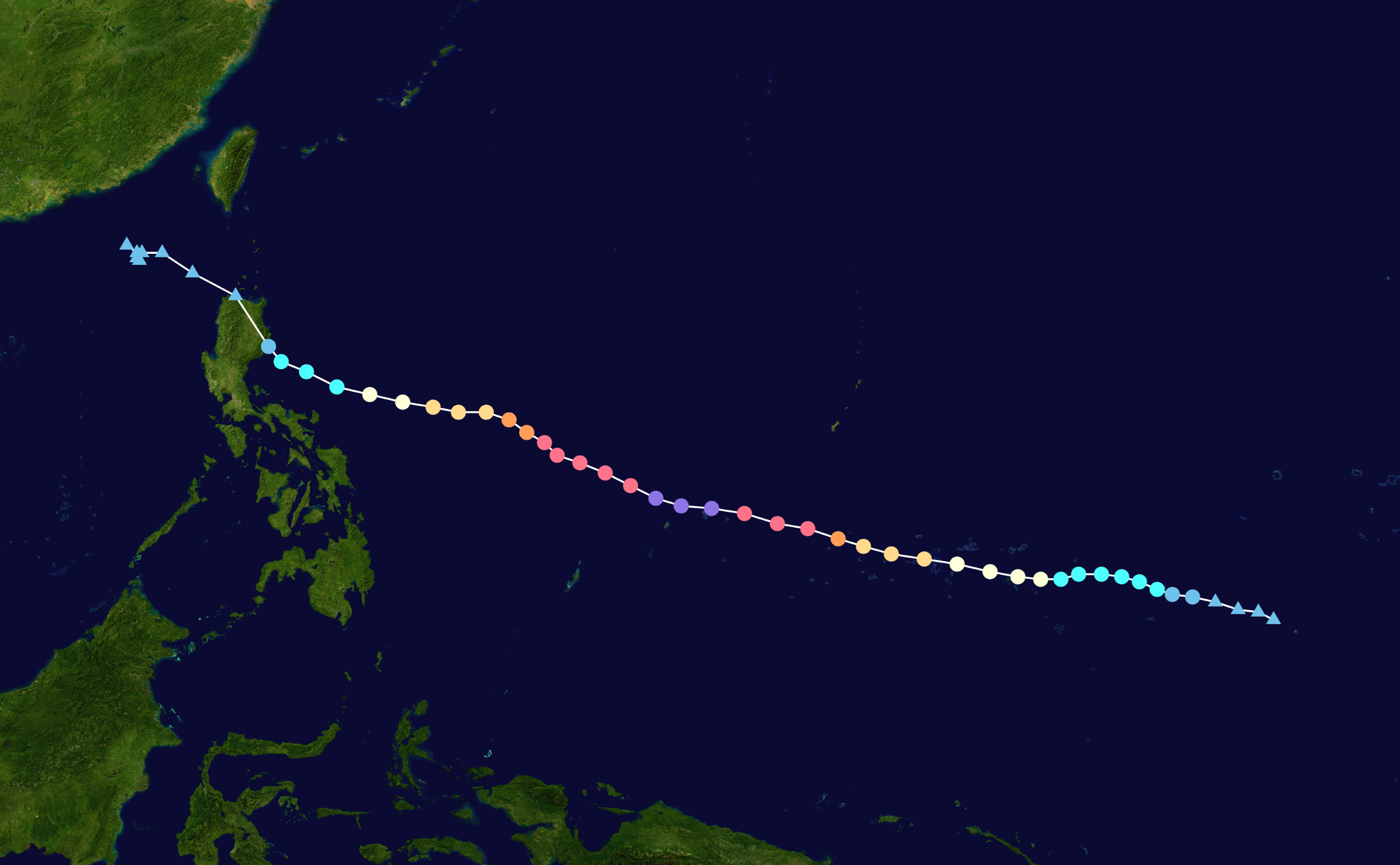
Map plotting the storm's track and intensity, according to the Saffir–Simpson scale Map key Saffir–Simpson scale Tropical depression (≤38 mph, ≤62 km/h) Tropical storm (39–73 mph, 63–118 km/h) Category 1 (74–95 mph, 119–153 km/h) Category 2 (96–110 mph, 154–177 km/h) Category 3 (111–129 mph, 178–208 km/h) Category 4 (130–156 mph, 209–251 km/h) Category 5 (≥157 mph, ≥252 km/h) Unknown Storm type Tropical cyclone Subtropical cyclone Extratropical cyclone, remnant low, tropical disturbance, or monsoon depression

An area of convection persisted on March 24 to the east-southeast of the Marshall Islands. Initially, it consisted of a broad but consolidating circulation, with outflow to the north offsetting moderate wind shear to aid in development. It gradually became better organized, with a curved area of convection wrapping into the center. On March 26, the JMA classified the system as a tropical depression just east of Pohnpei. On March 27, the JTWC started tracking the system as a Tropical Depression 04W. Moving west-northwestward, the system's center became more consolidated with convective banding becoming wrapped into it. The JTWC upgraded 04W to a tropical storm the same day, and the JMA upgraded the depression to a tropical storm named Maysak. (Note: The name Maysak (Khmer: ម៉ៃសាក់, [maj.ˈsaʔ]) was contributed by Cambodia and means teak (Tectona grandis) in Khmer.)

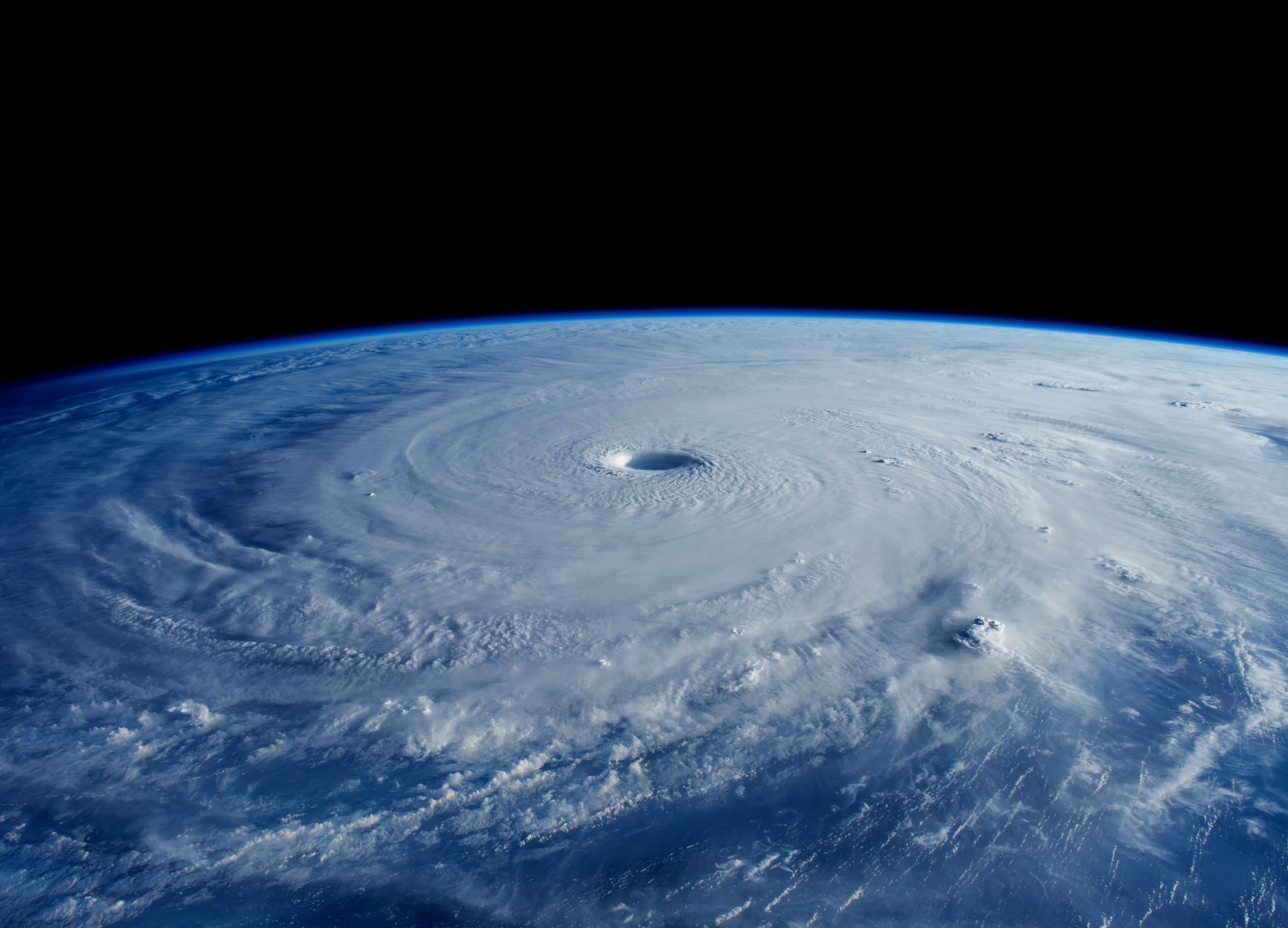
Typhoon Maysak from the International Space Station on March 31

On March 28, microwave satellite imagery revealed an eye with central dense overcast obscuring most of the feature; accordingly, the JMA upgraded Maysak to a severe tropical storm. The storm continued to strengthen while moving westward along the periphery of a subtropical ridge, The eye became more defined and the convection became more consolidated. Early on March 29, the JMA upgraded Maysak further to typhoon status, estimating 10 minute winds of 120 km/h (75 mph). That day, the typhoon moved over Chuuk Lagoon, the first time an eye crossed the lagoon since Typhoon Amy in 1971. The storm developed good outflow, enhanced by a strong northerly flow, although moderate wind shear kept Maysak from intensifying more quickly. However, the eye became clearly visible on March 30, and the typhoon rapidly intensified after the shear diminished. The JTWC reported a 30 km (19 mi) wide eye displaying the stadium effect, and surrounded by very deep convection. On March 31, the agency assessed that Maysak intensified into a Category 5-equivalent super typhoon on the SSHWS, with 1-minute sustained winds of 260 km/h (160 mph); this was increased to 280 km/h (175 mph) in post-season reanalysis, the highest on record for a pre-April typhoon. Around that time, the storm was moving through the Federated States of Micronesia (FSM), passing just north of Fais Island, and also very near Ulithi. Late on March 31, Maysak reached its peak intensity, and the JMA estimated peak winds of 195 km/h (120 mph) and a minimum pressure of 910 mbar (27 inHg), although operationally, the agency had estimated that Maysak was slightly more intense. This made Maysak the most powerful typhoon ever recorded before April, surpassing Typhoon Mitag of 2002, Typhoon Alice of 1979, and Typhoon Harriet of 1959.

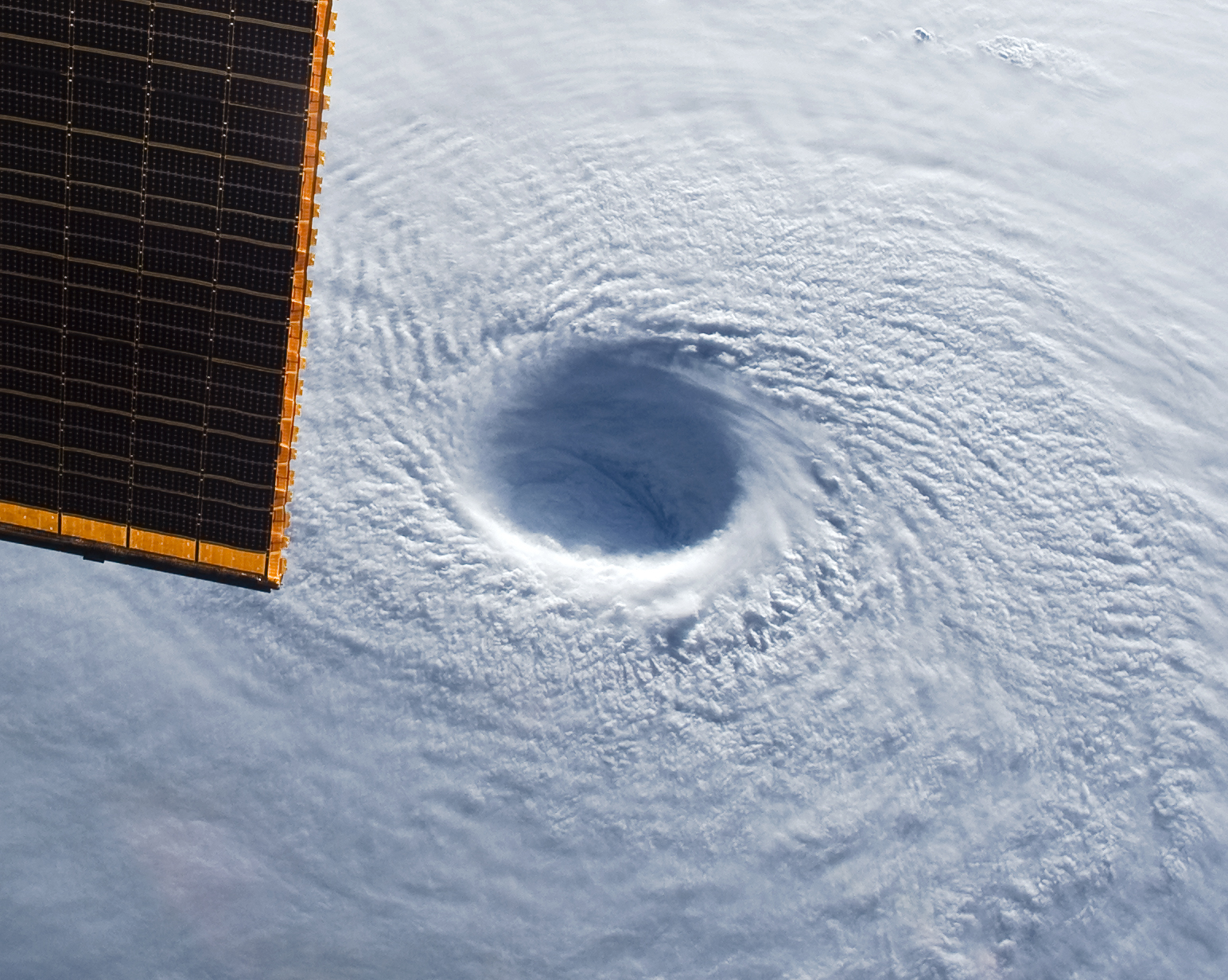
The eye of Maysak, as seen from the ISS, displaying a pronounced stadium effect

At peak intensity, Maysak had a nearly symmetric eye with an almost perfect ring of convection around it, with characteristics of an annular tropical cyclone. On April 1, the eye widened to about 40 km (25 mi) after undergoing an eyewall replacement cycle, and the storm began to weaken, with diminished intensity of the convection. The convection weakened significant in the storm's southern quadrant due to drier air and worsening upper-level conditions. On April 1, the Philippine Atmospheric, Geophysical and Astronomical Services Administration (PAGASA) started tracking Maysak, giving it the local name Chedeng. The eye widened further as dry air wrapped into the center, and stronger wind shear diminished the convection. On April 4, the JMA downgraded Maysak to a severe tropical storm, and later that day further to a tropical storm. The storm continued to weaken as it approached the Philippines, and late on April 4, the storm's the convection began dislocating from the circulation. At 08:00 Philippine Standard Time (00:00 UTC) April 5, Maysak made landfall in Dinapigue, Isabela as a minimal tropical storm, making it one of only eight storms to strike the island between January and April since 1945. Soon after it degraded into a tropical depression, and the weakening storm crossed Luzon with scattered thunderstorms. After emerging into the South China Sea, the system continued to the west-northwest, and Maysak dissipated on April 7.

== Impact ==
=== Federated States of Micronesia ===
Maysak passing north of Yap at peak intensity

Typhoon Maysak is responsible for extensive damage across the Federated States of Micronesia (FSM), with Chuuk and Yap States suffering the brunt of its impact. Agricultural impact was extensive, with 90 percent of the banana, breadfruit, and taro crops destroyed in Chuuk and Yap states. Overall, 281 homes were destroyed, and another 300 were damaged. According to the United States Agency for International Development (USAID), a total of 29,000 people were directly affected by the storm and damage throughout the FSM amounted to $8.5 million. There were four deaths and ten injuries related to the typhoon in the FSM.

Early in its development, Maysak brushed Kosrae within the FSM. Persistent westerly winds knocked down a few trees and damaged a few houses while also causing beach erosion. The storm later struck Chuuk State on March 29, passing directly over the main island as a Category 1-equivalent typhoon, with gusts as high as 175 km/h (109 mph). Rainfall on Weno Island reached 150 to 180 mm (6 to 7 in). High sustained winds, measured up to 114 km/h (71 mph) at the local National Weather Service office, downed numerous trees, power lines, and tore off roofs. An estimated 80–90 percent of homes in Chuuk sustained damage. The storm destroyed at least 830 homes and 37 businesses, displacing 6,760 people. Power to most of the state, including the entirety of Weno, was knocked out and communication was difficult. On Weno alone, the storm left about 7,000 people homeless. Water sources were rendered undrinkable. Outlying islands sustained heavy damage to crops and houses. Across Chuuk State, rough waves from the typhoon damaged seawalls and sank or damaged 11 boats or ships. There were at least four deaths in the state. A fallen tree killed a man and a child died after being struck by airborne debris. One person died due to a mudslide, and a newborn child died after being unable to arrive at the hospital due to fallen trees.

Two days after striking Chuuk, Maysak passed directly over Ulithi atoll and skirted Fais Island at peak intensity, resulting in extensive damage. According to Guam Governor Eddie Calvo, sustained winds reached 210 km/h (130 mph) in Ulithi and 160 km/h (100 mph) on Fais, with gusts reaching 240 km/h (150 mph) on Ulithi. All structures on Ulithi not made of concrete were severely damaged or destroyed by Maysak's powerful winds. Power and water supplies to Ulithi were completely lost during the storm. The entirety of the island's crop were ruined by the typhoon's storm surge, with early estimates indicating that it would be a full year before crops could be planted again. Though spared a direct hit, Yap proper was also hit hard with reports of airborne debris during the storm. Outlying islands were also affected; on Faraulep, water wells were contaminated and fruit trees were knocked down. During the storm, 18 fishermen were stranded Pikolot Island and West Fayew Island, but they returned home afterward.

=== Philippines ===
Animation of issued PSWS for Typhoon Chedeng as it approaches the Philippines before weakening

Ahead of the storm, over 24,000 people evacuated Philippines's northeastern province of Aurora. Many radio stations, typically which close during Easter, remained operational to broadcast the storm. Officials issued storm warnings, and the military was on alert. Beaches were closed, boats were ordered to remain at port, and 10 flights were canceled. The Department of Social Welfare and Development reported that ₱300.9 million (US$6.8 million) worth of funds and supplies were available for possible relief efforts. Approximately 28,000 family food packs were prepositioned in warehouses across Luzon.

Striking the Philippines as a rapidly weakening system, Maysak had only minimal effects in the country, producing strong waves and light rainfall. Across Aurora and Isabela provinces, a total of 2,761 people were directly affected by the storm, most of whom were evacuated prior to Maysak's landfall. No damage or loss of life was reported; however, four people were injured after waves generated by Maysak hit them while they were taking selfies along the shoreline of Dipaculao town in Aurora province on April 4. An overloaded, unregistered ferry capsized off Sulu Province in Mindanao on April 3, resulting in five deaths. The Philippine Coast Guard stated that seas at the time were calm and the sinking likely resulted from overcrowding of the vessel rather than Typhoon Maysak.

== Aftermath ==
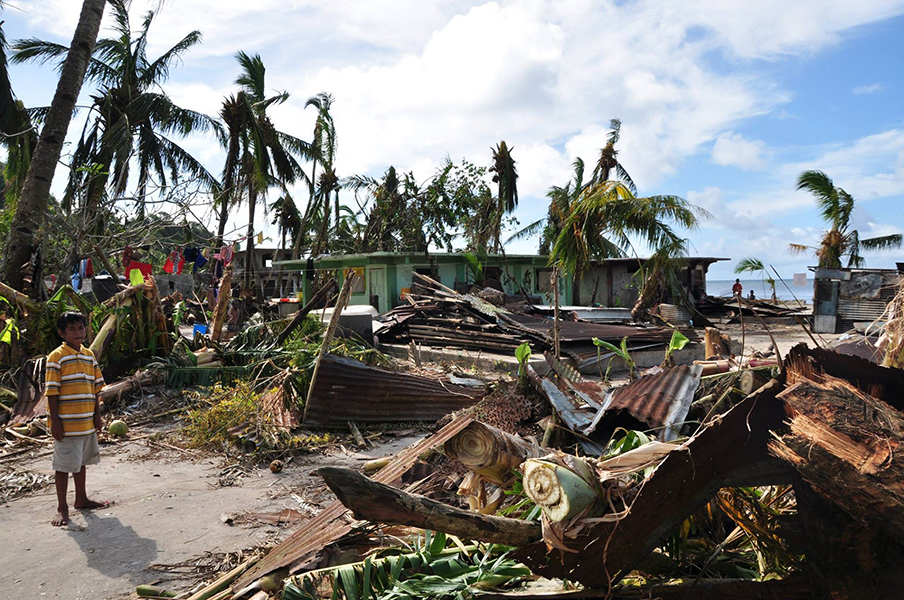
Damage on Chuuk Atoll

Chuuk Governor Johnson Elimo issued a state of emergency on April 1 and stated that international assistance was necessary. Immediate concerns included the possibility of residents starving with most of the state's crops ruined. Yap Governor Tony Ganngiyan also issued a state of emergency on April 1. On April 9, the Congress of the Federated States of Micronesia held a special two-day session at the request of President Manny Mori, which included determination of typhoon relief funds. They allocated $1.5 million toward relief for Chuuk and Yap States on April 11. The president also issued a price freeze to pre-storm levels to prevent price gouging.

The FSM government estimated that residents on Fais and Ulithi would need food rations for 3–6 months following the typhoon. Debris removal at Chuuk International Airport allowed for flights to the state to resume on April 1. Emergency assistance across the nation was hampered by the remote and small nature of the islands it comprises. In many instances, communities can only be reached by boat. Further complicating issues was the large number of trees uprooted or downed by the storm which blocked numerous roads. Generators had been supplied to Ulithi and Fais by April 6, allowing for water pumps to be activated and supply clean water. Power and water supply was gradually restored, although many remained without power by two weeks after the storm. On April 6, a United States Coast Guard helicopter provided an aerial assessment of the islands affected. Damage assessment was difficult due to the many sparse islands affected across open ocean. Relief supplies stockpiled by the Micronesian Red Cross were distributed in the immediate aftermath of Maysak; however, these supplies were exhausted by April 8. On April 14, the FSM government sent a patrol boat to Chuuk, delivering rice, ramen noodles, and water.

Due to their Compact of Free Association, United States President Barack Obama declared a state of disaster for the FSM on April 28, which allocated federal assistance for rebuilding. This followed a request by FSM President Mori on the previous day. USAID transported relief goods and $2.1 million worth of aid, including reverse osmosis kits and water distribution tanks. On Ulithi, the USAID delivered 20,000 kg (44,000 lb) worth of food to residents. Throughout the FSM, the agency assisted in repairing buildings, providing housing assistance to residents whose homes were destroyed, as well as plastic sheeting. By May 8, the United States government had provided nearly $2.96 million in assistance, including $620,000 sent to the Food and Agriculture Organization of the United Nations for regrowing damaged crops.

Several countries, agencies, and non-governmental organizations came to the aid of the FSM in the wake of Maysak. On April 13, the Government of Australia provided A$100,000 (US$77,000) and two patrol boats for recovery and relief operations. As an offer of "comfort and support", the Chinese government gave the FSM $500,000 in cash on April 21. The Government of Japan sent water treatment and transportation supplies to the FSM government, while the International Organization for Migration distributed 20 water treatment units to Ulithi. The European Union also sent 47 rainwater storage units, which would aid in helping future water supply.

== See also ==
- Weather of 2015
- Tropical cyclones in 2015
- Typhoon Isa (1997) – a strong typhoon in April 1997 that struck Guam
- Typhoon Kujira (2003) – a strong typhoon in April 2003 that affected the Philippines, Taiwan, and Japan
- Typhoon Noul (2015) – a similarly intense storm that struck northern Luzon just over a month after Maysak
- Typhoon Wutip (2019) – the most powerful February typhoon on record
- Typhoon Surigae (2021) – the most powerful April typhoon recorded
