= Tropical Storm Mujigae (2009) =

Pacific tropical storm in 2009

Tropical Storm Mujigae (Maring)
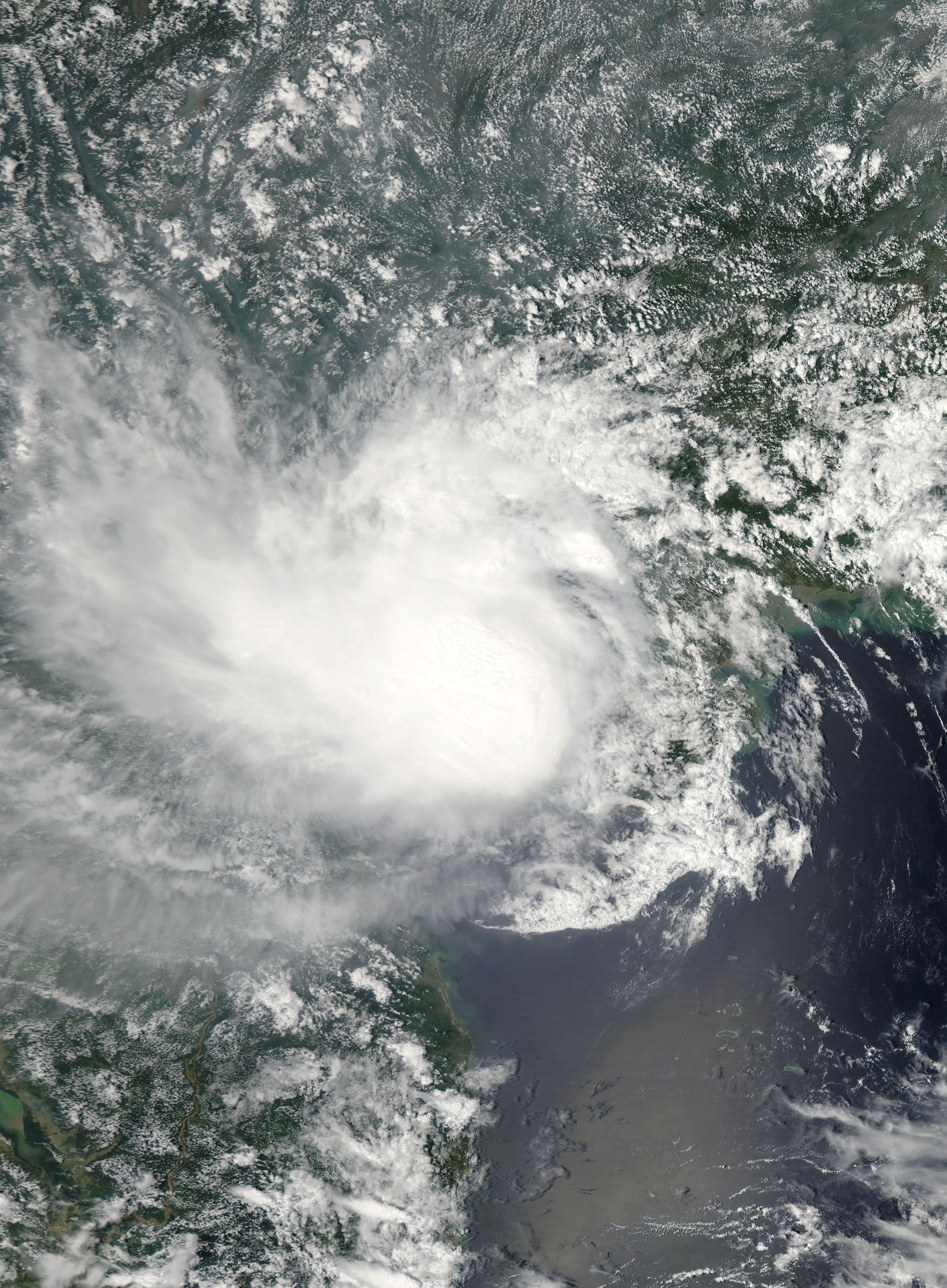
- Tropical storm Mujigae near peak intensity on 11 September

Meteorological history
- Formed: 8 September 2009
- Dissipated: 12 September 2009

Tropical storm
- 10-minute sustained (JMA)
- Highest winds: 75 km/h (45 mph)
- Lowest pressure: 994 hPa (mbar); 29.35 inHg

Tropical depression
- 1-minute sustained (SSHWS/JTWC)
- Highest winds: 55 km/h (35 mph)
- Lowest pressure: 998 hPa (mbar); 29.47 inHg

Overall effects
- Fatalities: 11 direct
- Damage: $14.6 million (2009 USD)
- Areas affected: Philippines, Hong Kong, China, Vietnam
- IBTrACS
- Part of the 2009 Pacific typhoon season

Tropical Storm Mujigae, known in the Philippines as Tropical Depression Maring was a tropical storm that affected the Philippines, China, Hong Kong, and Vietnam in early September 2009. Mujigae originated from an area of convection that developed along with a monsoon trough with favorable conditions on 8 September. The disturbance organized to a tropical depression and was assigned the names 14W by the Joint Typhoon Warning Center and Maring by PAGASA later that day. Tropical Depression 14W would rapidly develop and attain tropical storm status by the JMA and be assigned the name Mujigae on 10 September. Mujigae soon encountered unfavorable conditions with wind shear and make landfall in Hainan Island on 11 September and Vietnam on 12 September before rapidly weakening and dissipating.

== Meteorological history ==
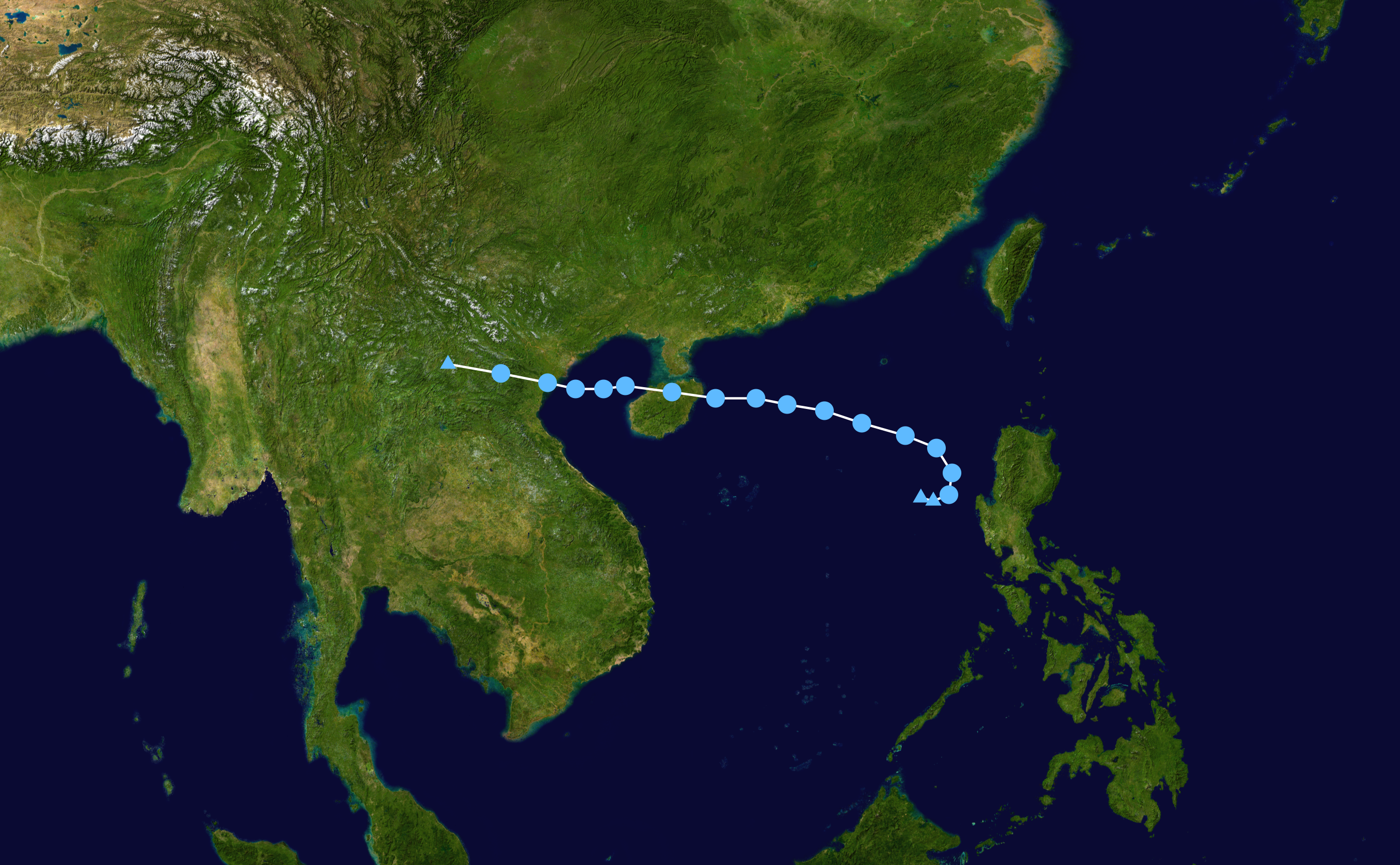
Map plotting the storm's track and intensity, according to the Saffir–Simpson scale Map key Saffir–Simpson scale Tropical depression (≤38 mph, ≤62 km/h) Tropical storm (39–73 mph, 63–118 km/h) Category 1 (74–95 mph, 119–153 km/h) Category 2 (96–110 mph, 154–177 km/h) Category 3 (111–129 mph, 178–208 km/h) Category 4 (130–156 mph, 209–251 km/h) Category 5 (≥157 mph, ≥252 km/h) Unknown Storm type Tropical cyclone Subtropical cyclone Extratropical cyclone, remnant low, tropical disturbance, or monsoon depression

Early on 8 September 2009, the Joint Typhoon Warning Center reported that an area of convection had persisted about 340 km (210 mi) northwest of Manila in the Philippines. The disturbance had a broad low-level circulation center with convection starting to consolidate and was developing along the monsoon trough in favorable conditions. Later that day both the Philippine Atmospheric, Geophysical and Astronomical Services Administration (PAGASA) and the Japan Meteorological Agency (JMA) reported that the disturbance had become a tropical depression with PAGASA assigning the name of Maring to the depression as the low-level circulation center became more developed. The next morning, the JTWC designated the tropical depression as 14W after the system had rapidly consolidated with deep convective bands forming in the low-level circulation center. The depression was steered by a low to mid-level ridge to the northeast, however, a deeper secondary ridge was expected to assume steering the system to the northeast as it moved out of PAGASA's area of responsibility.

During that day, the depression rapidly developed, being upgraded a tropical storm by the JMA early on 10 September, numbered the international number 0913 and the name Mujigae. (Note: The name Mujigae (Korean: 무지개, [mud͡ʑiɡɛ]) was contributed by North Korea and means rainbow in Korean.) However, at that time, Mujigae's low-level circulation center was partially exposed with convection confined to the western portion of the low-level circulation center due to a moderate amount of vertical wind shear associated with an anticyclone to the northeast of Mujigae. This affected the system which prevented Mujigae from further intensifying. Mujigae then made landfall early the next day and passed over Northern Hainan Island with observations from Meilan, Hainan, showing that Mujigae was a 55 km/h (35 mph) Tropical depression. However, the JMA did not downgrade Mujigae to a tropical depression at this time. As Mujigae moved into the Gulf of Tonkin, the low-level circulation center became less organized with the JTWC forecasting that Mujigae would dissipate within six hours of making landfall on Vietnam. Mujigae then made landfall on Vietnam early on 12 September. The JTWC then issued their last advisory with the JMA downgrading Mujigae to a tropical depression and their final advisory as Mujigae's remnants had dissipated.

== Preparations and impact ==
=== Philippines ===
When PAGASA issued their first warning on 8 September 2009, they placed the provinces of Ilocos Sur, La Union, Zambales, Bataan, Western Pangasinan, and Lubang Island under Public Storm Warning Signal One. They kept these warnings in force until early the next day, when they cancelled the signals for Bataan and Lubang Island, and placed the whole of Pangasinan as well as Ilocos Norte, Abra under the Public Storm Warning Signal One before cancelling all of the signals later that morning. PAGASA also warned residents living in low-lying areas and near mountain slopes to take all the necessary precautions against possible flash floods and landslides.

In western Luzon, including Manila, a 48-hour rainfall was recorded when the depression was just forming. The depression enhanced the southwest monsoon that brought torrential rains to the area. In Laguna, two children were killed due to landslides caused by torrential rains brought by Maring. Late on 8 September, both the JMA and the PAGASA declared the system was a minor tropical depression. On 9 September, all classes in Manila were suspended due to incessant rain and flooding. The National Disaster Coordinating Council reported that at least three villages in Malabon were submerged in 18 inch deep floodwaters. At least four streets in the area were impassable for light vehicles. Six provinces were given Public Storm Signal Number One.

In Valenzuela City, 15 low-lying barangays located in the city's first district were submerged. In Bulacan, five towns and two cities were flooded with water levels reaching four feet. In Bataan, the town of Dinalupihan was placed under the state of calamity after 22 barangays were affected by flash floods. In Pampanga, the NDCC placed the towns of Santa Ana, San Luis, Minalin, Mexico, Macabebe, Masantol, Apalit, Guagua, Sasmuan, Lubao, and Bacolor in state of calamity due to swelling rivers in Tarlac.

More than 300,000 residents of four northern provinces were affected by floods, including about 3,300 people who fled to evacuation centers and more than 41,000 who moved in with their relatives and friends. Overall, damages were estimated at 25 million Philippine Peso in agricultural land.

=== Hainan Island ===
As Mujigae made its landfall over the Hainan island, the storm had caused economic losses of 56.43 million yuan (8.3 million U.S. dollars), with more than 50,000 people evacuated and some farmland, fish ponds, roads, and water conservation systems submerged. Flights at the Meilan Airport in the province's capital of Haikou were suspended on Thursday afternoon because of strong winds and heavy rains. All inbound and outbound train services in Hainan were suspended.

=== Hong Kong ===
Late on 9 September 2009, the Hong Kong Observatory issued the public storm standby signal 1 as Mujigae was located within 800 km (500 mi) of Hong Kong. Early the next day, the standby signal was replaced with Storm Signal Number 3, which meant that strong winds were expected to affect the city. Signal 3 stayed in force for 13 hours, until it was replaced with the Storm Signal 1, then was cancelled two hours later.

== See also ==
- Other systems named Mujigae
- Effects of the 2009 Pacific typhoon season in the Philippines
- Tropical Storm Mirinae (2016)
- Tropical Storm Nangka (2020)
- Tropical Storm Kompasu (2021)
- Tropical Storm Zita
