= List of storms named Mujigae =

The name Mujigae (Korean: 무지개, [mud͡ʑiɡɛ]) was used for two tropical cyclones in the northwestern Pacific Ocean. The name was contributed by North Korea and means rainbow in Korean. It replaced Maemi after the 2003 Pacific typhoon season.

- Tropical Storm Mujigae (2009) (T0913, 14W, Maring) – made landfall on Hainan Island and then on Vietnam.
- Typhoon Mujigae (2015) (T1522, 22W, Kabayan) – a rapidly intensified and destructive Category 4 typhoon that formed just east of the Philippines and made landfall in Guangdong, China at peak intensity.

The name Mujigae was retired following the 2015 Pacific typhoon season and was replaced with Surigae (Korean: 수리개, [sʰuɾiɡɛ]), which means a black kite (Milvus migrans) in the Hamgyŏng dialect.
