= Typhoon Mitag (2002) =

Pacific typhoon in 2002

Typhoon Mitag (Basyang)
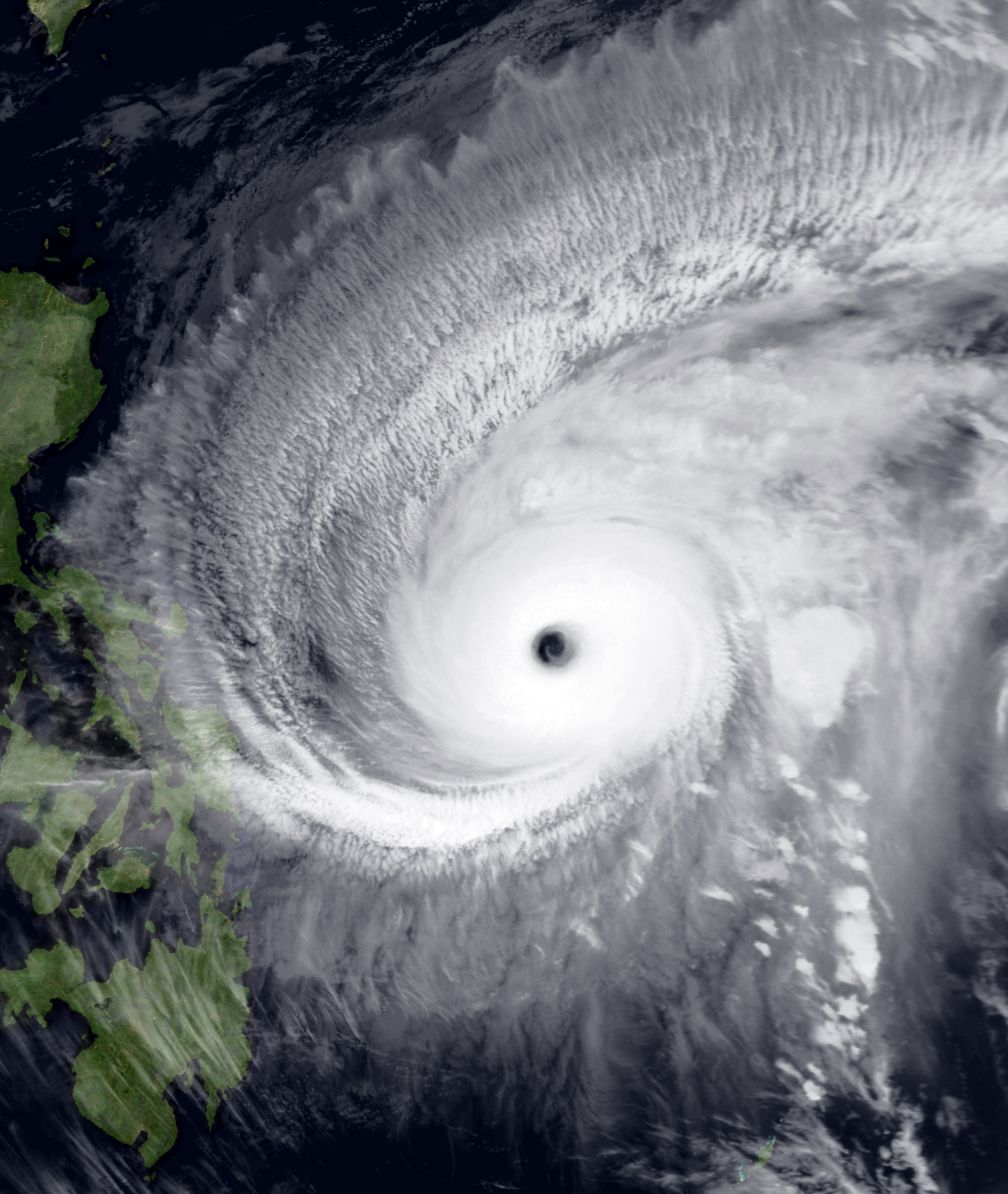
- Mitag at peak intensity on March 5

Meteorological history
- Formed: February 26, 2002
- Dissipated: March 9, 2002

Very strong typhoon
- 10-minute sustained (JMA)
- Highest winds: 175 km/h (110 mph)
- Lowest pressure: 930 hPa (mbar); 27.46 inHg

Category 5-equivalent super typhoon
- 1-minute sustained (SSHWS/JTWC)
- Highest winds: 260 km/h (160 mph)
- Lowest pressure: 898 hPa (mbar); 26.52 inHg

Overall effects
- Fatalities: 2 indirect
- Damage: $150 million (2002 USD)
- Areas affected: Federated States of Micronesia
- IBTrACS
- Part of the 2002 Pacific typhoon season

Typhoon Mitag, (Note: The name Mitag (Yapese: Mitaeg, [mitaːɣ]) was contributed by the Federated States of Micronesia and is a feminine given names meaning "my eyes" in Yapese.) known in the Philippines as Typhoon Basyang, was the first super typhoon on record in the month of March. The second storm of the 2002 Pacific typhoon season, Mitag developed from a trough near the equator on February 25 near the Federated States of Micronesia (FSM). It moved westward through the archipelago and intensified into a typhoon before passing near Yap on March 2. High winds and heavy rainfall affected the state, resulting in an islandwide power outage and destroying hundreds of houses. Mitag caused severe crop damage that resulted in food shortages. The rainfall and storm surge flooded much of the coastline as well as Yap's capital, Colonia. Damage totaled $150 million, mostly from crop damage. (Note: All damage totals are in 2002 United States dollars.) There was one death related to the storm's aftermath.

After affecting Yap, Mitag turned to the northwest and later to the north due to an approaching trough. It passed to the north of Palau, contributing to one death there. Despite predictions of weakening, the typhoon continued to intensify, reaching peak winds of 175 km/h (109 mph) 10 minute sustained) on March 5. (Note: The Japan Meteorological Agency uses 10-minute sustained winds, while the Joint Typhoon Warning Center uses 1-minute sustained winds. The conversion factor between the two is 1.14.) The combination of cooler air and interaction with the westerlies caused Mitag to weaken significantly. Only four days after reaching peak winds, the storm dissipated well to the east of the Philippines, where the typhoon was also given the local name Basyang.

== Meteorological history ==
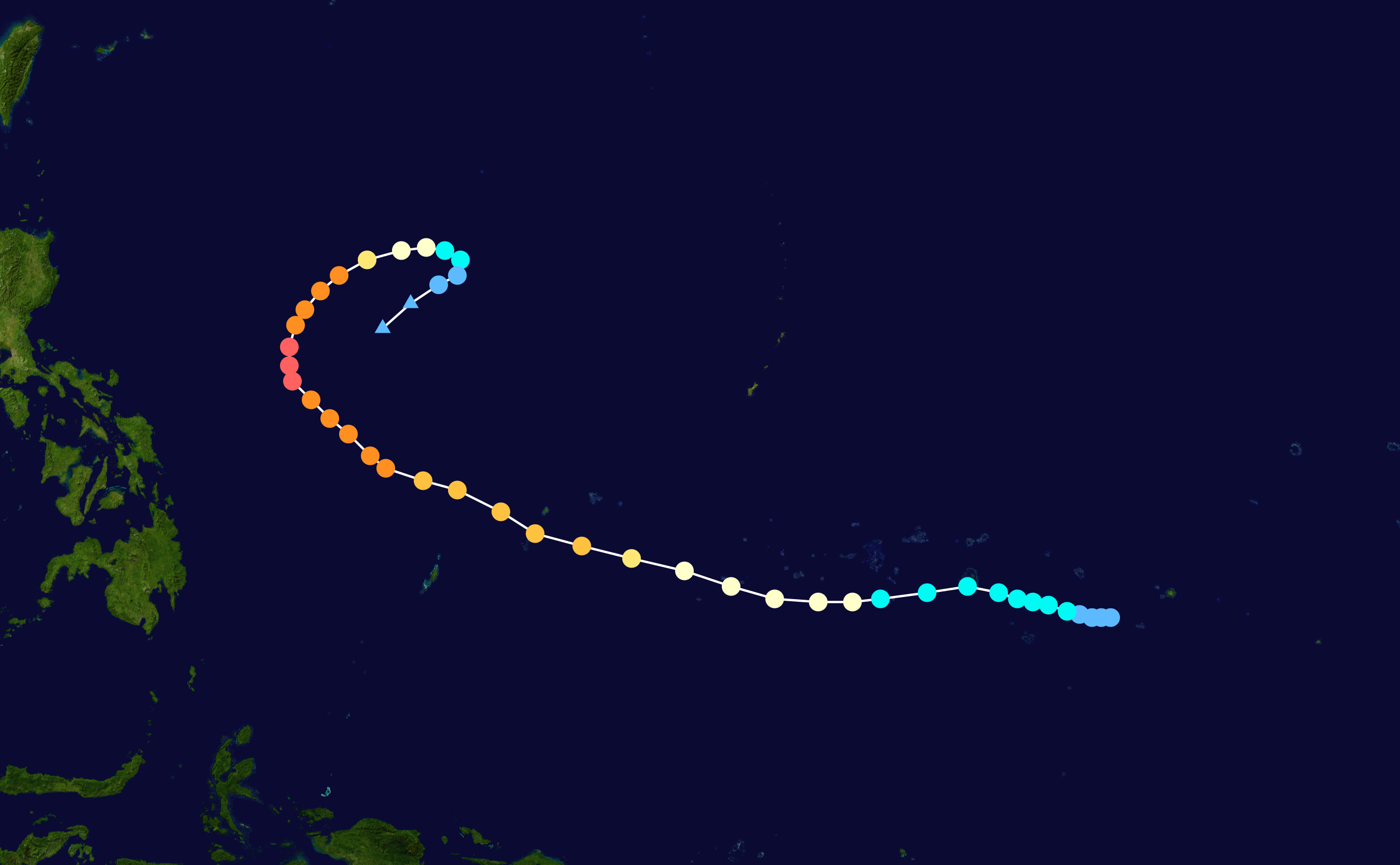
Map plotting the storm's track and intensity, according to the Saffir–Simpson scale Map key Saffir–Simpson scale Tropical depression (≤38 mph, ≤62 km/h) Tropical storm (39–73 mph, 63–118 km/h) Category 1 (74–95 mph, 119–153 km/h) Category 2 (96–110 mph, 154–177 km/h) Category 3 (111–129 mph, 178–208 km/h) Category 4 (130–156 mph, 209–251 km/h) Category 5 (≥157 mph, ≥252 km/h) Unknown Storm type Tropical cyclone Subtropical cyclone Extratropical cyclone, remnant low, tropical disturbance, or monsoon depression

The origins of Typhoon Mitag were from a trough near the equator in late February 2002. A circulation developed on February 25 south of Pohnpei, which initially had disorganized convection due to moderate wind shear. After further organization, the system developed into a tropical depression on February 26. Located south of the subtropical ridge, it moved generally westward, intensifying into Tropical Storm Mitag near Chuuk State in the Federated States of Micronesia (FSM) on February 28. This was based on analysis from the Japan Meteorological Agency (JMA); (Note: The Japan Meteorological Agency is the official Regional Specialized Meteorological Center for the western Pacific Ocean.) the Joint Typhoon Warning Center (JTWC) (Note: The Joint Typhoon Warning Center is a joint United States Navy – United States Air Force task force that issues tropical cyclone warnings for the western Pacific Ocean and other regions.) estimated that the system intensified into a tropical storm a day prior. It passed just south of Weno in Chuuk while continuing westward, intensifying quickly due to decreasing wind shear. The JTWC upgraded the storm to a typhoon on March 1, and the JMA followed suit a day later.

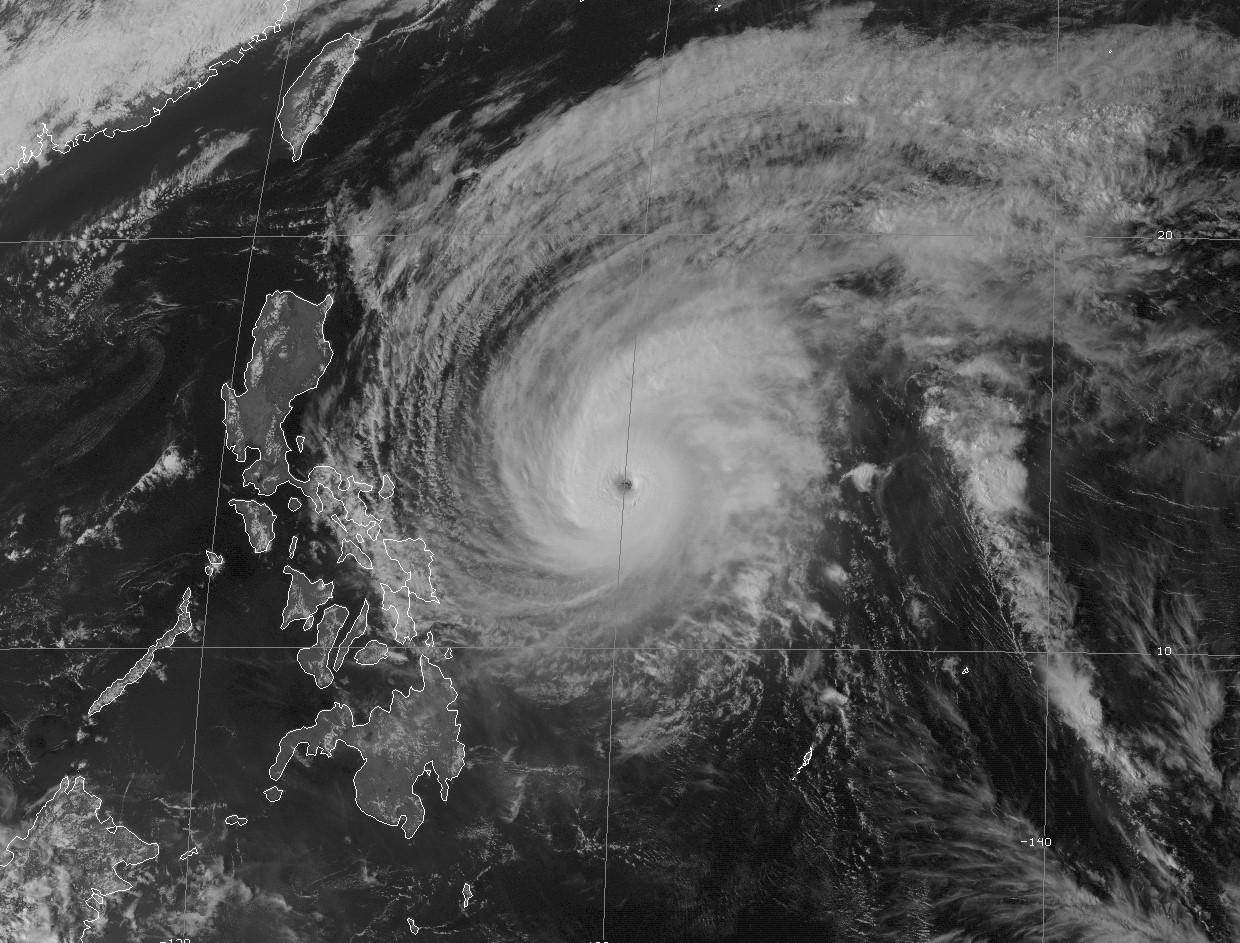
GMS-5 visible imagery of Mitag at its peak intensity on March 5

Despite being early in the season, Mitag intensified significantly to the east of the Philippines. On March 2, an eye was observed on satellite imagery in the center of the deepest convection. Late that day, Mitag passed just south of the island of Yap in the FSM. On March 3, the typhoon entered the area of warning responsibility of the Philippine Atmospheric, Geophysical and Astronomical Services Administration (PAGASA); the agency gave it the local name "Basyang". An approaching deep-layer trough turned the typhoon to the northwest and later to the north. Although southwesterly wind shear was expected to restrict intensification, Mitag turned to the northeast in the same direction as the shear, causing the outflow to increase. After completing an eyewall replacement cycle, very deep convection surrounded the eye, and Dvorak numbers peaked at 7.0. On this basis, the JTWC upgraded Mitag to a super typhoon on March 5, estimating peak winds of 260 km/h (160 mph) 1 minute sustained) while the storm was located about 610 km (380 mi) east of Catanduanes in the Philippines. This made it the only super typhoon on record in the month until Typhoon Maysak of 2015. Also on March 5, the JMA estimated peak winds of 175 km/h (109 mph) 10 minute sustained), PAGASA assessed the same intensity as JMA, and the National Meteorological Centre of China estimated peak winds of 205 km/h (127 mph) 10 minute sustained).

For about a day, the typhoon maintained its peak winds, before increasing wind shear and cool, dry air imparted significant weakening. In a 24‑hour period, the JTWC estimated that winds decreased by 110 km/h (68 mph) 1 minute sustained) while the storm turned to the northeast, and on March 7, Mitag weakened below typhoon-force. A surge in the monsoon combined with the upper-level Westerlies displaced the low-level circulation from the upper-level center, causing the low-level system to turn to the east and south. On March 8, the JTWC issued its last advisory, and Mitag dissipated on March 9.

== Impact ==
Tropical Storm Mitag first affected Chuuk State in the FSM, producing a wind gust of 76 km/h (47 mph) and heavy rainfall up to 176 mm (6.9 in). The rains caused a few minor landslides and flooded some homes on Weno Island.

Later, Mitag passed near several islands in Yap State, first affecting Woleai. On the island, high wind gusts of around 170 km/h (110 mph) knocked out power and downed breadfruit and coconut trees. The winds destroyed a few houses, forcing residents to evacuate to a local school. Mitag dropped heavy rainfall while passing by Yap state, peaking at 255 mm (10.0 in) on Ngulu Atoll. On Yap, the typhoon produced sustained winds of 56 km/h (35 mph), with gusts to 141 km/h (88 mph). The winds also caused an islandwide power outage that lasted for about two days, and damaged the roof of the Yap International Airport terminal. High waves and storm surge damaged coastal structures and flooded areas up to 183 m (600 ft) inland. The seawall at the capital city of Colonia was damaged, and portions of the town were flooded 1.5 m (4.9 ft) deep. The storm destroyed over 150 houses on Yap, leaving hundreds staying in shelters. Across the island, the winds knocked down trees onto roads, and saltwater intrusion caused severe crop damage; most of the taro and banana crops were destroyed. Damage in the FSM totaled $150 million, of which $100 million from crop damage.

Lastly, the typhoon passed about 320 km (200 mi) north of Palau, producing gusty winds but no damage. There was an indirect death on the island after a person was crushed by a tree; he had been helping a friend cut down the tree out of fear it could cause damage during the storm.

== Aftermath ==
After Mitag struck Yap, the state's governor declared a 30‑day state of emergency and asked for aid from the national government. On May 29, United States President George W. Bush declared a major disaster for Yap, which allocated funding for repairing storm damage and storm damage mitigation. Crop damage from Mitag caused food shortages in Yap and Chuuk, and health problems related to the storm killed one person on Nomwin. Residents and businesses in Palau sent $3,000 in donations and other relief supplies to Yap, as well as $3,000 worth of oil. The state government sent about $2,000 to storm victims. Hospitals in Guam sent medical teams to Yap with blankets, clothing, and medical supply.

== See also ==
- Other tropical cyclones named Mitag
- Other tropical cyclones named Basyang
- Typhoon Isa
- Typhoon Sudal
- Typhoon Maysak (2015)
- Typhoon Wutip (2019)
- Typhoon Surigae
- Typhoon Jelawat (2018)
