= List of storms named Basyang =

The name Basyang has been used for seven tropical cyclones in the Philippine Area of Responsibility by PAGASA in the Western Pacific Ocean.

- Typhoon Mitag (2002) (T0202, 02W, Basyang) – affected Micronesia, killing one person and causing $150 million in damages
- Tropical Depression Basyang (2006) (01W) – a tropical depression that was only recognized by PAGASA and JTWC
- Typhoon Conson (2010) (T1002, 03W, Basyang) – a poorly-forecasted minimal typhoon which caused destruction in the Philippines
- Tropical Storm Kajiki (2014) (T1402, 02W, Basyang) – an early January tropical storm that caused flooding and landslides in the Philippines
- Tropical Storm Sanba (2018) (T1802, 02W, Basyang) – a minimal tropical storm which affected southern Philippines in February 2018
- Typhoon Malakas (2022) (T2201, 02W, Basyang) – an extremely large early-season Category 3-equivalent typhoon that remained at sea
- Tropical Storm Penha (2026) (T2602, 02W, Basyang) – a weak but costly tropical storm that made several landfalls in southern Philippines

Preceded by Ada	Pacific typhoon season names Basyang	Succeeded by Caloy
