= Tropical Storm Sanba (2018) =

Pacific tropical storm in 2018

Tropical Storm Sanba (Basyang)
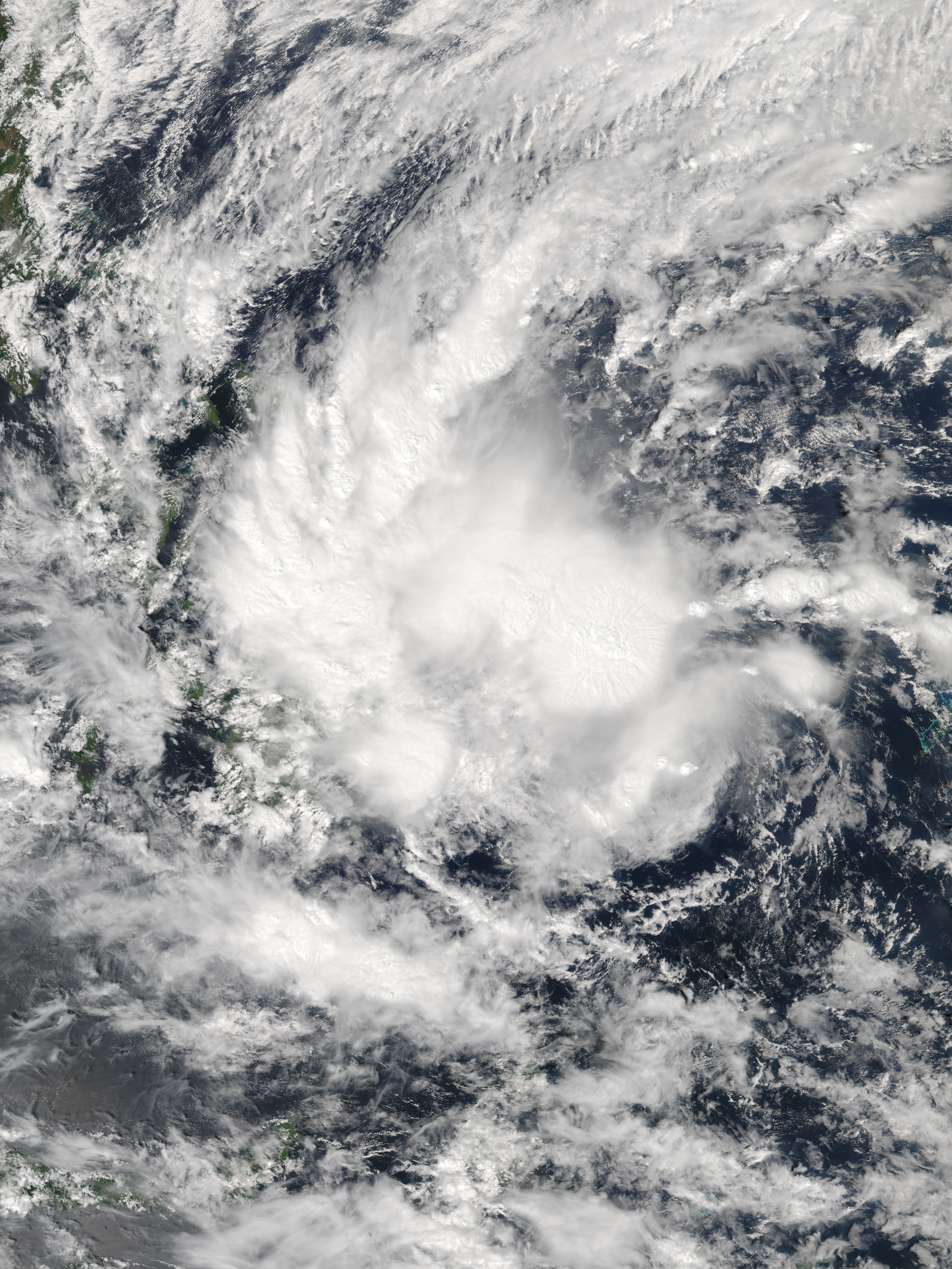
- Tropical Storm Sanba at peak intensity approaching the Philippines on February 12

Meteorological history
- Formed: February 8, 2018
- Dissipated: February 16, 2018

Tropical storm
- 10-minute sustained (JMA)
- Highest winds: 65 km/h (40 mph)
- Lowest pressure: 1000 hPa (mbar); 29.53 inHg

Tropical storm
- 1-minute sustained (SSHWS/JTWC)
- Highest winds: 75 km/h (45 mph)
- Lowest pressure: 999 hPa (mbar); 29.50 inHg

Overall effects
- Fatalities: 15 total
- Damage: $3.19 million (2018 USD)
- Areas affected: Caroline Islands, Philippines
- IBTrACS
- Part of the 2018 Pacific typhoon season

Tropical Storm Sanba, (Note: The name Sanba (Mandarin: 三巴, [sän˥ pä˥]) was contributed by Macau and refers to the Ruins of Saint Paul's in Mandarin.) known in the Philippines as Tropical Storm Basyang, was a weak tropical cyclone that affected southern and central parts of the Philippines in mid-February 2018. Sanba developed as a tropical depression in the open Pacific Ocean on February 8. The system moved generally westward while slowly developing, finally attaining tropical storm status on February 11. Soon after, wind shear caused the system to lose organization and remain as a minimal tropical storm through February 11 and 12. During this time, Sanba moved westwards then west-northwestwards, making landfall over northeastern Mindanao on February 13. The system weakened into a tropical depression before making another landfall in southeastern Negros later that day. After traversing the Philippine Islands, Sanba failed to reorganize significantly in the Sulu Sea and dissipated two days later west of Palawan.

As a developing system, Sanba brought minor flooding to Palau. From February 12 to 16, Sanba caused heavy rains, floods, and landslides across the southern and central Philippines, affecting over 250,000 people. About 40,000 people sought shelter in evacuation centers. More than 1,600 houses were damaged or destroyed. Power outages occurred in five places. Ports were closed and flights cancelled because of adverse weather conditions, which also caused damage to roads and bridges. Schools and workplaces were shut as Sanba passed over the Philippines. A total of 15 people were killed, mostly by flooded rivers and landslides, and 16 others were injured. Crop damage reached ₱168 million (US$3.19 million). (Note: All currencies are in their 2018 values and are converted to United States dollars using data from the International Monetary Fund published by the World Bank.)

== Meteorological history ==
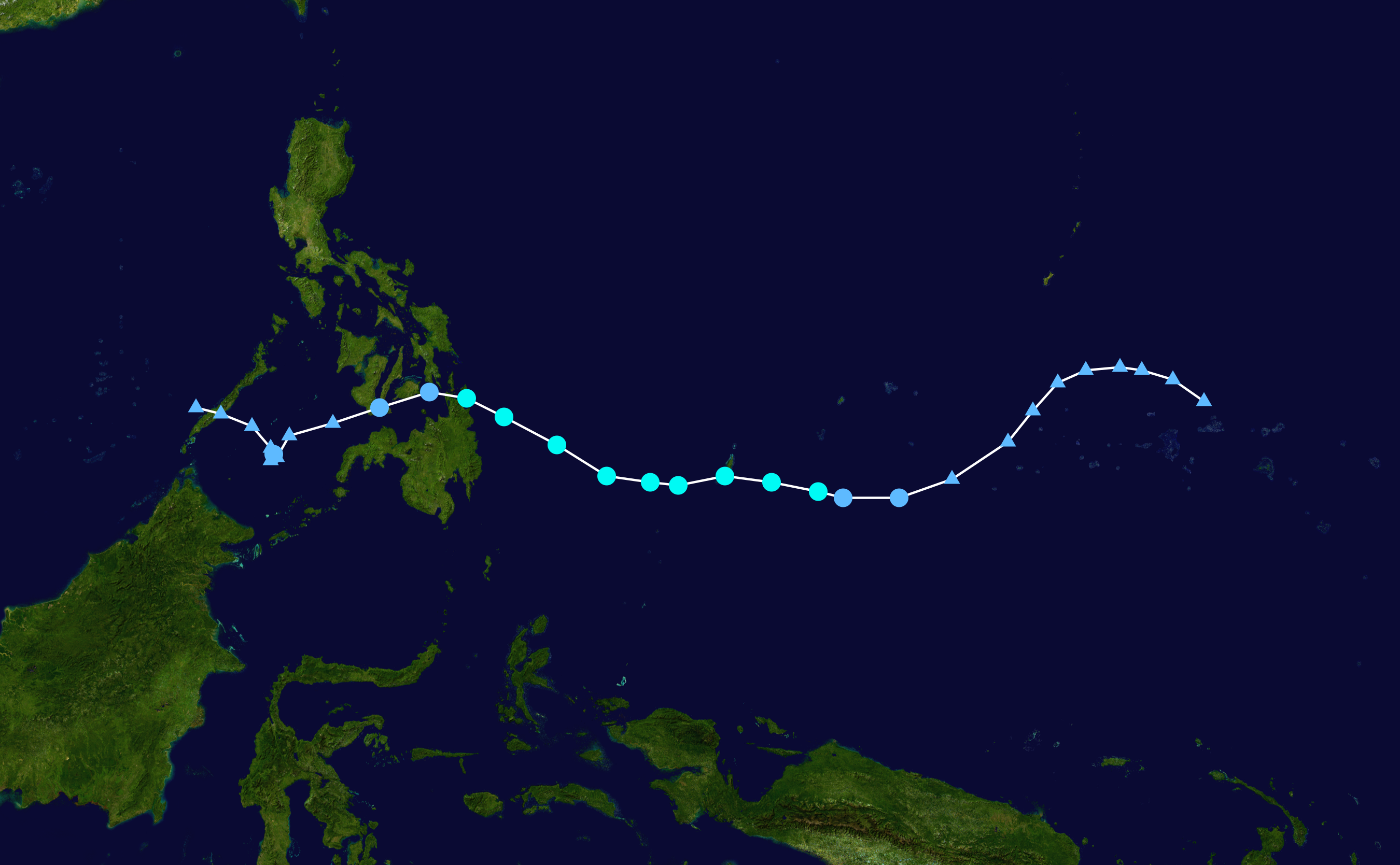
Map plotting the storm's track and intensity, according to the Saffir–Simpson scale Map key Saffir–Simpson scale Tropical depression (≤38 mph, ≤62 km/h) Tropical storm (39–73 mph, 63–118 km/h) Category 1 (74–95 mph, 119–153 km/h) Category 2 (96–110 mph, 154–177 km/h) Category 3 (111–129 mph, 178–208 km/h) Category 4 (130–156 mph, 209–251 km/h) Category 5 (≥157 mph, ≥252 km/h) Unknown Storm type Tropical cyclone Subtropical cyclone Extratropical cyclone, remnant low, tropical disturbance, or monsoon depression

Sanba originated from a tropical disturbance that developed about 1,050 mi (1,690 km) southeast of Guam on February 6. The system was initially disorganized and broad, with little thunderstorm activity. Amid generally favorable environmental conditions consisting of warm sea surface temperatures around 28–29 °C (82–84 °F) and moderate wind shear, the disturbance began to develop rainbands and a more well-defined circulation. At 00:00 UTC on February 8, the Japan Meteorological Agency (JMA) deemed the system to have consolidated into a tropical depression. (Note: The Japan Meteorological Agency is the official Regional Specialized Meteorological Center for the western Pacific Ocean.) At this time, the system was tracking northwest around a subtropical ridge to the northeast, but soon turned west then southwest as another subtropical ridge to the northwest of the depression strengthened. Over the next day, moderate wind shear kept the depression relatively disorganized, with the circulation remaining elongated. A burst of convection developed over the system on February 10 as it turned to the west, leading the United States-based Joint Typhoon Warning Center (JTWC) to also declare that the system had become a tropical depression at 12:00 UTC. The system quickly increased in organization over the next few hours, with extensive rainbands wrapping into the circulation from the north. As a result, the JTWC and JMA upgraded the system to a tropical storm on February 11 at 00:00 UTC and 06:00 UTC respectively, with the latter naming the system Sanba. At 06:00 UTC, the JMA assessed Sanba to have winds of 40 mph (65 km/h) and a minimum pressure of 1000 hPa (mbar; 29.53 inHg), while the JTWC estimated winds of 45 mph (75 km/h). (Note: Wind estimates from the JMA and most other basins throughout the world are sustained over 10 minutes, while estimates from the JTWC are sustained over 1 minute. On average, 1-minute winds are about 12% higher than 10-minute winds.)

The convective organization of Sanba quickly unraveled over the remainder of February 11, as wind shear caused the storm's low-level circulation center to become exposed. The system entered the Philippine Area of Responsibility before 14:00 UTC, upon which the Philippine Atmospheric, Geophysical and Astronomical Services Administration (PAGASA) gave it the local name Basyang. Despite the warm ocean waters of the Philippine Sea and strong outflow channels facilitating thunderstorm development, wind shear kept convection displaced to the northwest of Sanba's center. This meant Sanba stayed as a minimal tropical storm as it headed west-northwest towards Mindanao. On February 13, at around 01:15 UTC, Sanba made landfall in Cortes, Surigao del Sur as a tropical storm. The terrain of the Philippines weakened the system to a tropical depression shortly after. Sanba made a second landfall in Dumaguete at 13:00 UTC, before exiting into the Sulu Sea. Despite conducive sea surface temperatures near 27 °C (81 °F), Sanba's circulation was significantly disrupted by the mountains of the Philippines; the JTWC determined that the system's circulation was no longer closed by 18:00 UTC on February 13. A strong outflow channel briefly assisted convection to develop near Sanba's center on February 14 as the low-level circulation reorganized, and the JTWC assessed that Sanba briefly restrengthened into a tropical depression at around 15:00 UTC. Soon after, strong southeasterly wind shear removed thunderstorm activity from the center once again, leading the JTWC to declare Sanba to have degenerated into a tropical disturbance for the final time. The JMA continued to track the system as a tropical depression until February 16, when they declared that Sanba dissipated as a tropical cyclone at 12:00 UTC over the South China Sea.

== Effects ==
=== Micronesia ===
Shortly after Sanba's formation, the National Weather Service in Guam issued a tropical storm watch for western parts of Yap State, encompassing Fais, Ulithi, Yap, and Ngulu. The tropical storm watch was extended to Kayangel and Koror in Palau on February 10. The next day, a tropical storm warning was issued for Kayangel and Koror. The tropical storm watches in Yap State were subsequently cancelled as Sanba passed to the south. All warnings were discontinued on February 12. The system brought only mild tropical storm conditions and minor flooding to Palau, with no significant damage reported.

=== Philippines ===
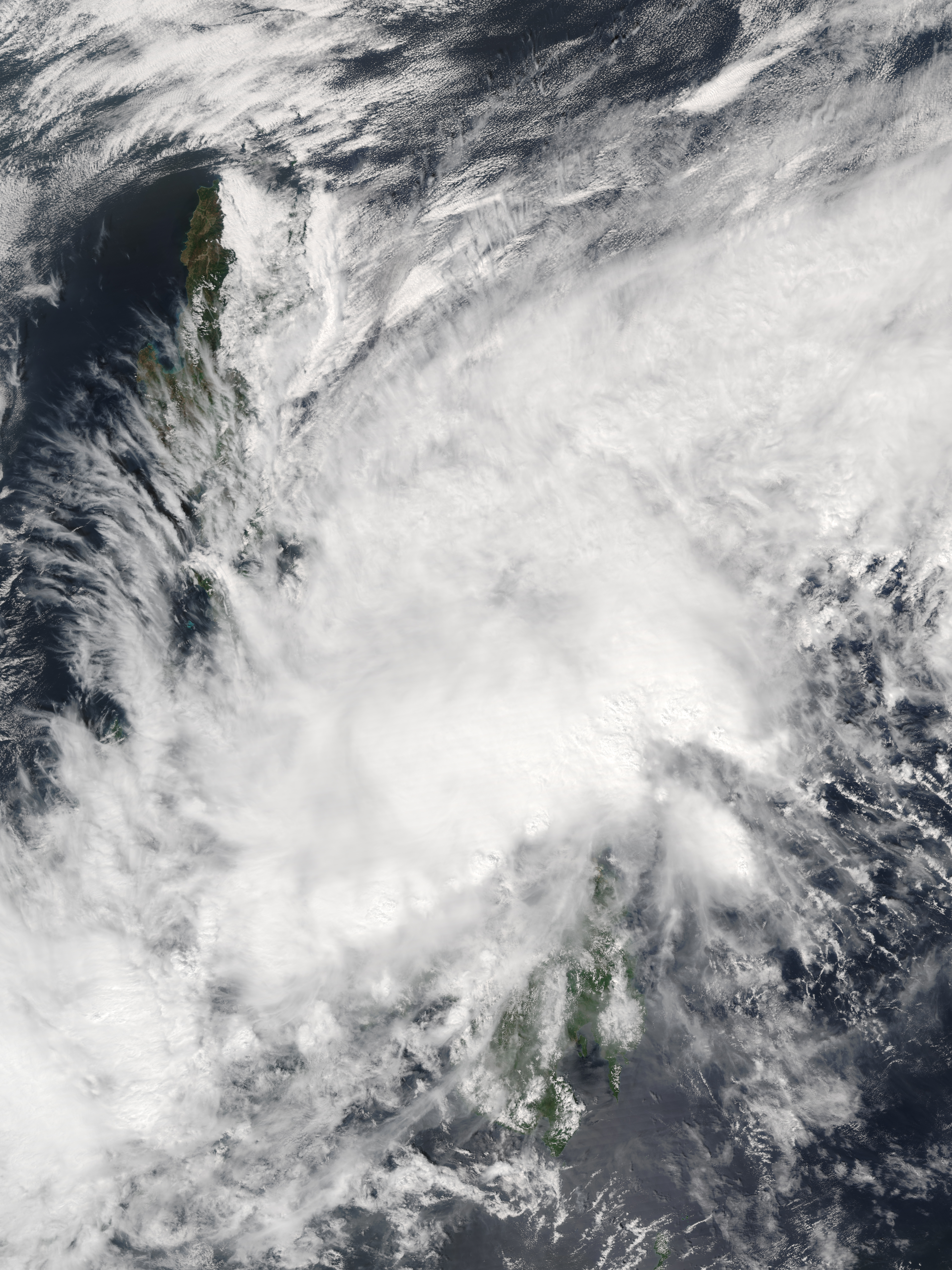
Tropical Storm Sanba over the Philippines on February 13

Just before Sanba entered the Philippine Area of Responsibility on February 11, the PAGASA issued Tropical Cyclone Warning Signal (TCWS) #1 for the Dinagat Islands and three provinces in Mindanao. This was extended to another seven provinces in Mindanao and two provinces in the Visayas early on February 12. For the rest of the day, the warning area continued to expand over most of Mindanao and southern parts of the Visayas, while eight provinces in Mindanao saw their warnings upgraded to TCWS #2. On the morning of February 13, TCWS #2 was issued for five provinces in the Visayas, and TCWS #1 was issued for the Cuyo Islands and southern Masbate. TCWS #2 was cancelled later that day as Sanba weakened into a tropical depression, while Palawan went under TCWS #1. The warnings were gradually lifted as Sanba crossed the Sulu Sea, with no remaining warnings by the afternoon of February 14.

Sanba brought rain and wind to 254,859 people across 17 provinces of the Philippines. Around 40,000 residents sought refuge from landslides and floods in 194 evacuation centers. Port closures stranded up to 4,642 passengers and 130 ships across Northern Mindanao and the Eastern and Southern Visayas. Thirty-two domestic flights were cancelled from February 12 to 16. Classes were suspended in 362 municipalities from February 12 to 15, while workplaces in Butuan were closed from February 12 to 13. Heavy rain from Sanba caused flooding in 163 barangays. A total of 1,660 houses were damaged, of which 429 were completely destroyed; most of the homes damaged were in Caraga. Siargao Island, Silay City, Carmen municipality in Bohol, and the municipalities of Culaba and Kawayan in Biliran were affected by power outages from February 12 to 13. Twenty-two roads and eight bridges were damaged by floods and landslides. Five people were killed by landslides in Carrascal, Surigao del Sur. In Surigao del Norte, four people drowned in swollen rivers and one was killed by a landslide. A rockslide killed a toddler in Albuera, Leyte. Three fishermen drowned in rough seas near Borongan in Eastern Samar. In total, 15 fatalities resulted from Sanba's passage through the country, and 16 people were injured. Two boats carrying people capsized: a fishing boat near Silago, Southern Leyte, and a passenger vessel en route to Homonhon. All four on board the two boats survived. Agricultural damage in the Eastern Visayas and Caraga totaled ₱168 million (US$3.19 million), mostly coming from flooded rice fields.

Following the storm, a state of calamity was declared in Carrascal and Lanuza municipalities in Surigao del Sur. The 402nd Infantry Brigade of the Philippine Army deployed four battalions in Caraga to conduct disaster response operations. The Department of Social Welfare and Development, in combination with local government units, provided ₱11.6 million (US$220,000) worth of assistance to affected residents in Caraga, Mimaropa, and the Central and Eastern Visayas.

== See also ==
- Other tropical cyclones named Sanba
- Other tropical cyclones named Basyang
- Weather of 2018
- Tropical cyclones in 2018
- Tropical Storm Lingling (2014) – caused landslides and flooding in Mindanao
- Tropical Storm Bolaven (2018) – struck Mindanao a month earlier
- Tropical Storm Penha (2026) – struck similar areas 8 years later, carried the same Philippine name
