= List of storms named Ada =

The name Ada has been used for three tropical cyclones worldwide: one each in the Philippine Area of Responsibility in the West Pacific Ocean, the South-West Indian Ocean, and the Australian region.

In the West Pacific:

- Tropical Storm Nokaen (2026) (T2601, 01W, Ada) — a weak storm that closely passed the Philippines

In the South-West Indian:

- Tropical Storm Ada (1961) — made landfall in Madagascar

In the Australian region:

- Cyclone Ada (1970) — a Category 3 severe tropical cyclone that made landfall in Queensland

The name Ada was retired in the Australian region after the 1969–70 season.

Preceded by	Pacific typhoon season names Ada	Succeeded by Basyang
