= List of storms named Surigae =

The name Surigae (Korean: 수리개, [sʰuɾiɡɛ]) has been used to name two tropical cyclones in the northwestern Pacific Ocean. The name was contributed by North Korea and refers to a black kite (Milvus migrans) in the Hamgyŏng dialect. It replaced the name Mujigae after it was retired following the 2015 Pacific typhoon season.

- Typhoon Surigae (2021) (T2102, 02W, Bising) – a Category 5 typhoon passed not far from the coast of the Philippines; was the strongest Northern Hemisphere tropical cyclone to form in the first four months of the calendar year.
- Typhoon Surigae (2026) (T2626, 25W, Queenie) – a compact Category 4 super typhoon that passed near the coast of Japan.

Preceded by Dujuan	Pacific typhoon season names Surigae	Succeeded by Choi-wan
