= Annular tropical cyclone =

Tropical cyclone with a symmetrical shape

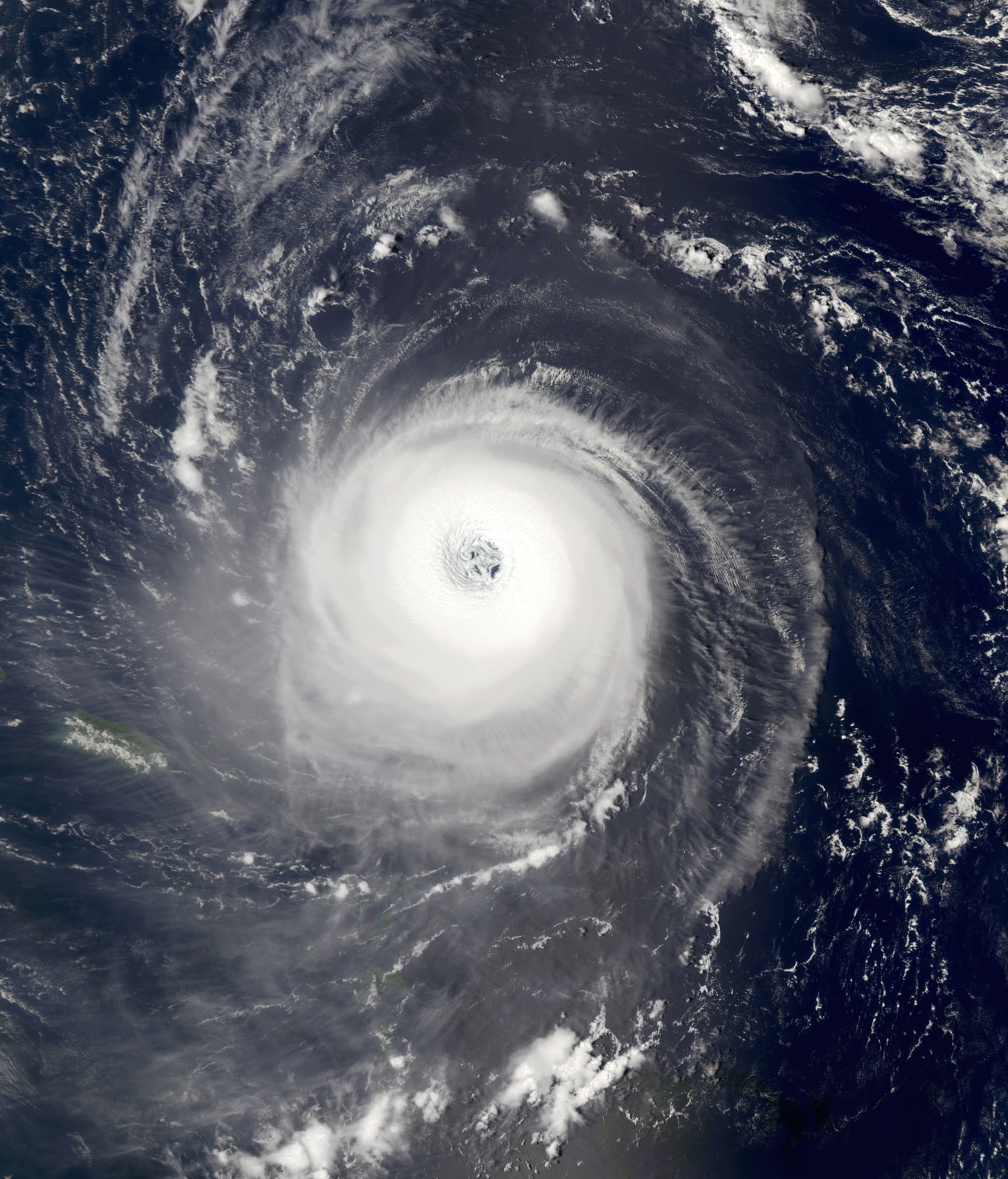
Satellite image of Hurricane Isabel of 2003, displaying a large, circular, and symmetric eye, and symmetrical storm shape, which are characteristics of annular tropical cyclones. Isabel is also exhibiting a pinwheel eye, a rare feature found in some annular tropical cyclones.

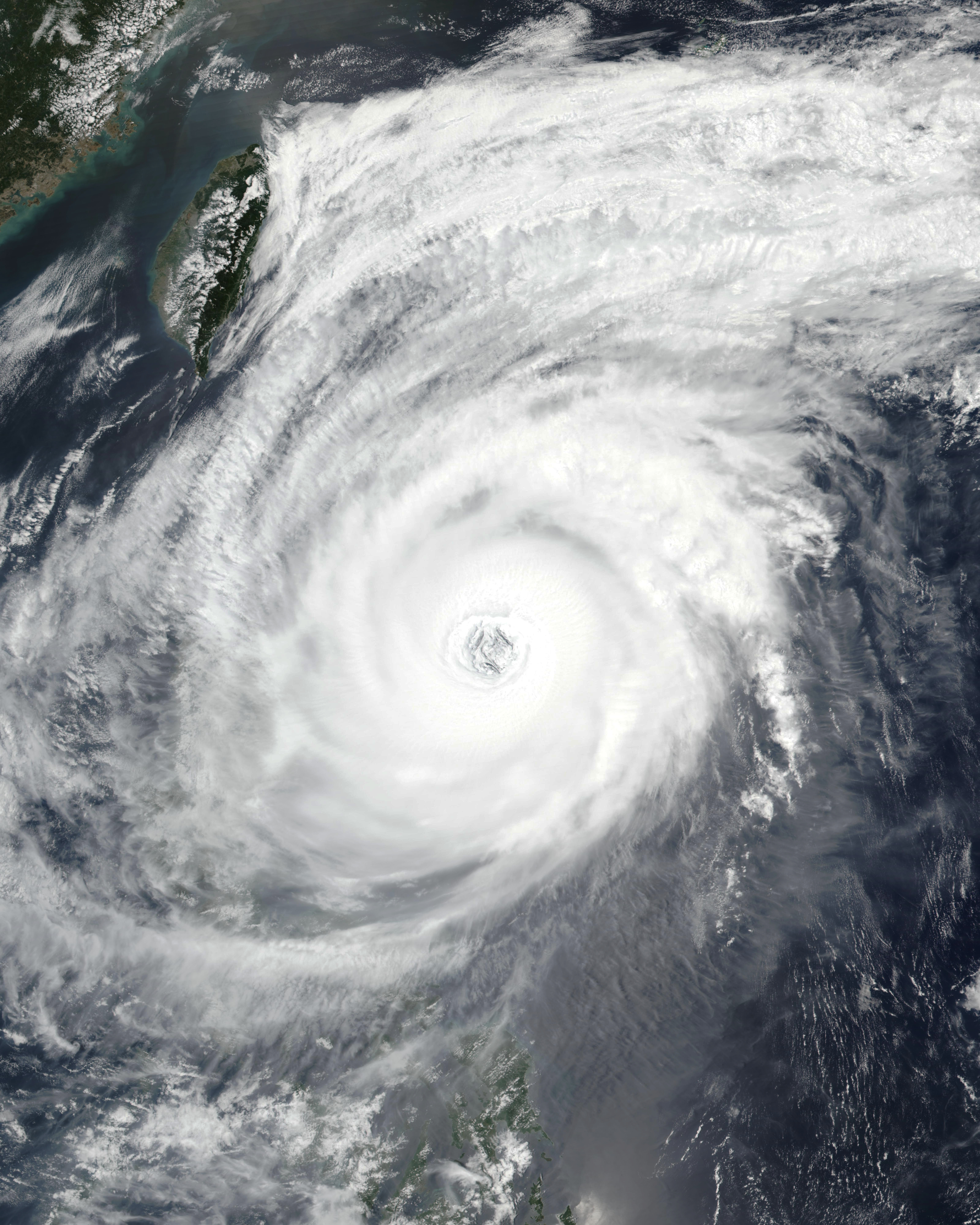
Typhoon Surigae of 2021 displaying annular characteristics

An annular tropical cyclone is a tropical cyclone that features a normal to large, symmetric eye surrounded by a thick and uniform ring of intense convection, often having a relative lack of discrete rainbands, and bearing a symmetric appearance in general. As a result, the appearance of an annular tropical cyclone can be referred to as akin to a tire or doughnut. Annular characteristics can be attained as tropical cyclones intensify; however, outside the processes that drive the transition from asymmetric systems to annular systems and the abnormal resistance to negative environmental factors found in storms with annular features, annular tropical cyclones behave similarly to asymmetric storms. Most research related to annular tropical cyclones is limited to satellite imagery and aircraft reconnaissance as the conditions thought to give rise to annular characteristics normally occur over open water, well removed from landmasses where surface observations are possible.

== Characteristics and identification ==
The annular hurricane was first defined as a subset of tropical cyclones by John Knaff of Colorado State University and James Kossin of the University of Wisconsin–Madison in 2002 by use of infrared satellite imagery, which serves as the visual means of ascertaining annular characteristics within tropical cyclone. Knaff and Kossin defined an annular tropical cyclone as a tropical cyclone that maintains either an average or larger-than-average eye surrounded by deep convection containing the storm's inner core and a lack of convection occurring outside the central dense overcast for at least three hours. As a result, annular storms lack the rainbands characteristic of typical tropical cyclone. These features lend the storm an axisymmetric appearance common to annular tropical cyclones. However, this definition is only applicable while a storm maintains these characteristics—when and while a storm does not feature annular characteristics, the tropical cyclone is considered asymmetric. In addition to the primary defining characteristics, the diurnal pulsation of the cirrus cloud canopy associated with outflow is subdued once storms become annular. Some annular tropical cyclones may also display a "pinwheel eye", a feature in which conditions in the storm causes its eye to take the appearance of a spoked wheel. An algorithm for identification of annular tropical cyclones in real-time by objective criteria—the Annular Hurricane Index—has been developed, and shows some power, but was not yet operational, as of 2008. However, the National Hurricane Center (NHC) later started used the Annular Hurricane Index for the purpose of assessing annular tropical cyclones. The index takes into account the cloud height of the storm, the radii of the eye, and other similar factors, using satellite imagery, and then produces a number, with the maximum value on the scale being 100. Any storm with a value of zero or lower are not annular, while storms with positive indices are considered to be annular. Tropical cyclones with higher indices have more annular characteristics than those with lower indices.

Although tropical cyclones can achieve annular characteristics across a wide spectrum of intensities, annular storms are typically strong tropical cyclones, with average maximum sustained windspeeds of 108 kn (124 mph; 200 km/h). In addition, storms attaining annular characteristics are less prone to weakening as a result of negative environmental factors. Annular cyclones can maintain their respective peak intensities for extended periods of time unlike their asymmetric counterparts. Following peak intensity, such systems will tend to gradually taper off. This unusual intensity persistence makes their future intensities difficult to forecast and often results in large forecast errors. In an analysis of hurricanes in the East Pacific and North Atlantic between 1995 and 1999, Knaff and Kossin observed that the National Hurricane Center underestimated the intensity of annular hurricanes 72 hours out by 18.9 kn (35.0 km/h, 21.7 mph).

A survey of Pacific typhoons between 1990 and 2009 found only 12 with annular characteristics, representing an occurrence rate of 4 percent.

== Transition from asymmetric cyclones and necessary conditions ==
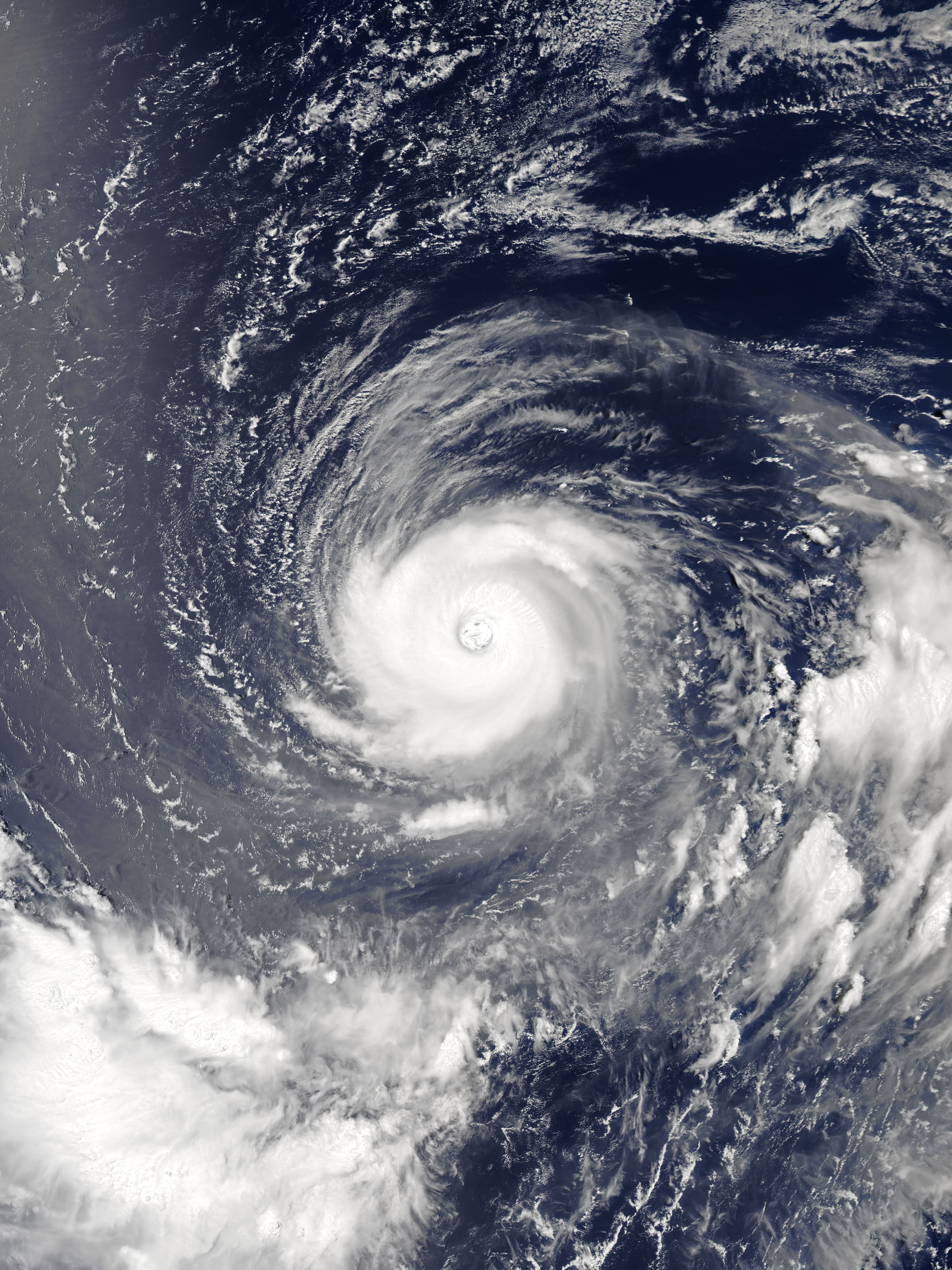
Typhoon Noru of 2017, displaying most annular characteristics, however some small rainbands are still visible

Tropical cyclones can become annular as a result of eyewall mesovortices mixing the strong winds found in the eyewalls of storms with the weak winds of the eye, which helps to expand the eye. In addition, this process helps to make the equivalent potential temperature (often referred to as theta-e or $\theta_e$) within the eye relatively uniform. This transition takes roughly 24 hours to complete and can be considered a type of eyewall replacement cycle. Winds have also been found to decrease in a stairstep like fashion within the radius of maximum wind, which may indicate that more wind is mixed between the eye and eyewall as cyclones strengthen, which helps to explain why annular characteristics are generally exclusive to storms of higher intensities.

The intensity of annular systems is typically greater than 83.5% of the maximum potential intensity, suggesting that the conditions in which storms gain annular characteristics are generally conducive for tropical cyclone persistence and intensification. Annular tropical cyclones also require low wind shear, and of the storms in the East Pacific and North Atlantic studied by Knaff and Kossin, all exhibited easterly winds and cold air in the upper troposphere. Strong outflow is an additional factor, suggesting that the conditions that give rise to annular tropical cyclones are most optimal towards the equatorward side of a subtropical ridge and within the tropics. However, warmer sea surface temperatures (SSTs) are not required for annular tropical cyclones, with annular characteristics developing only within a narrow range of modest SSTs, ranging from 25.4–28.5 °C (77.7–83.3 °F).

Conditions favorable for annular typhoon development in the Western North Pacific are localized within two areas within a zonal belt between 20°N−30°N; one of these areas lies over the central part of the basin, while the other is located east of Taiwan. Within the Eastern North Pacific, such conditions were present only 3 percent of the time between 1998 and 1999. In the same timeframe, the North Atlantic basin only exhibited conducive conditions for annular development 0.8 percent of the time.

== See also ==
- Tropical cyclogenesis
- Tropical cyclone forecasting
- Central dense overcast
- Coriolis force
