= List of storms named Agaton =

The name Agaton has been used for six tropical cyclones in the Philippine Area of Responsibility by PAGASA in the Western Pacific Ocean.

- Tropical Storm Tapah (2002) (T0201, 01W, Agaton) – affected northern Luzon ahead of its dissipation.
- Tropical Depression Agaton (2006) (Agaton) – weakened as it crossed over northern Samar and southern Luzon
- Tropical Storm Omais (2010) (T1001, 02W, Agaton) – did not make landfall
- Tropical Storm Lingling (2014) (T1401, 01W, Agaton) – affected the Philippines early in the year.
- Tropical Storm Bolaven (2018) (T1801, 01W, Agaton) – affected southern parts of the Philippines early in January.
- Tropical Storm Megi (2022) (T2202, 03W, Agaton) – deadly tropical storm in the Eastern Visayas.

The name Agaton was retired following the 2022 Pacific typhoon season and was replaced with Ada, which means fairy in Cebuano.
