= Tropical Storm Nokaen =

Pacific tropical storm in 2026

Tropical Storm Nokaen (Ada)
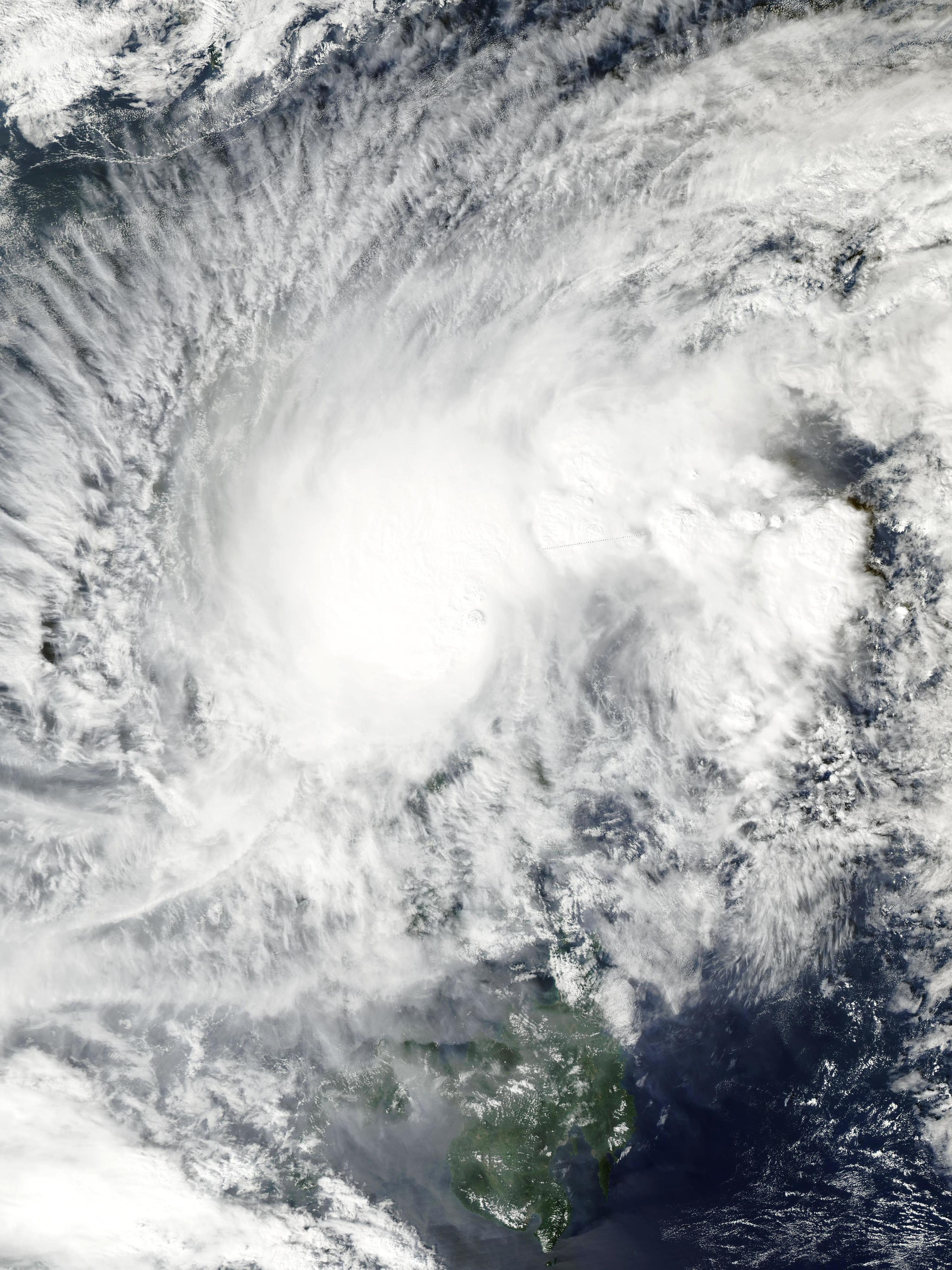
- Nokaen at peak intensity in the Philippine Sea on January 17

Meteorological history
- Formed: January 13, 2026
- Remnant low: January 22, 2026
- Dissipated: January 27, 2026

Tropical storm
- 10-minute sustained (JMA)
- Highest winds: 75 km/h (45 mph)
- Lowest pressure: 996 hPa (mbar); 29.41 inHg

Tropical storm
- 1-minute sustained (SSHWS/JTWC)
- Highest winds: 95 km/h (60 mph)
- Lowest pressure: 992 hPa (mbar); 29.29 inHg

Overall effects
- Fatalities: 2
- Injuries: 2
- Damage: $24,000 (2026 USD)
- Areas affected: Philippines
- Part of the 2026 Pacific typhoon season

Tropical Storm Nokaen, (Note: The name Nokaen (Lao: ນົກແອ່ນ, [nok̚˧ ʔɛːn˧]) was contributed by Laos and means swallow in Lao. It replaced the name Phanfone after the 2019 season.) locally named Ada, was a moderate tropical cyclone that brought heavy flooding to the Philippines in mid-January 2026. It was the first named storm develop in the month of January since Tropical Storm Pabuk in 2019 and became the second-longest-lasting January tropical storm in the Western Pacific basin, behind only Tropical Storm Axel in 1992. The first named storm of the 2026 Pacific typhoon season, Nokaen developed from a low-pressure area south of Palau. Situated within a favorable environment, the Joint Typhoon Warning Center (JTWC) issued a Tropical Cyclone Formation Alert (TCFA) at 01:30 UTC on January 14, before designating the system as Tropical Depression 01W. At 11:00 PHT (03:00 UTC) that same day, the Philippine Atmospheric, Geophysical and Astronomical Services Administration (PAGASA) followed suit, assigning 01W the local name Ada, which was a replacement name for Agaton after being retired in 2022. At 06:00 UTC on January 15, the Japan Meteorological Agency (JMA) upgraded the system to a tropical storm and assigned it the name Nokaen; PAGASA did the same at 17:00 PHT (09:00 UTC). At 03:00 UTC on January 16, the JTWC also upgraded Nokaen to tropical storm status.

Beginning January 14, PAGASA issued Tropical Cyclone Wind Signal No. 1 for numerous areas, with some regions upgraded to Signal No. 2 three days later. On January 15, the National Disaster Risk Reduction and Management Council (NDRRMC) declared 31 seaports non-operational, while the Department of Social Welfare and Development (DSWD) raised a blue alert. As of January 17, approximately 8,800 people had been stranded at various seaports. Disaster agencies in Catanduanes were placed on full alert, while the Philippine Coast Guard Duty Response Group in Southeastern Mindanao was placed on heightened alert. Sixteen domestic flights were cancelled, affecting 1,008 passengers.

Two people died in a rockslide in Matnog. Flooding was reported in numerous towns throughout Albay and Catanduanes. Several spillways nationwide were inundated and rendered impassable. Many highways were flooded, and numerous municipalities experienced landslides and mudslides.

== Meteorological history ==
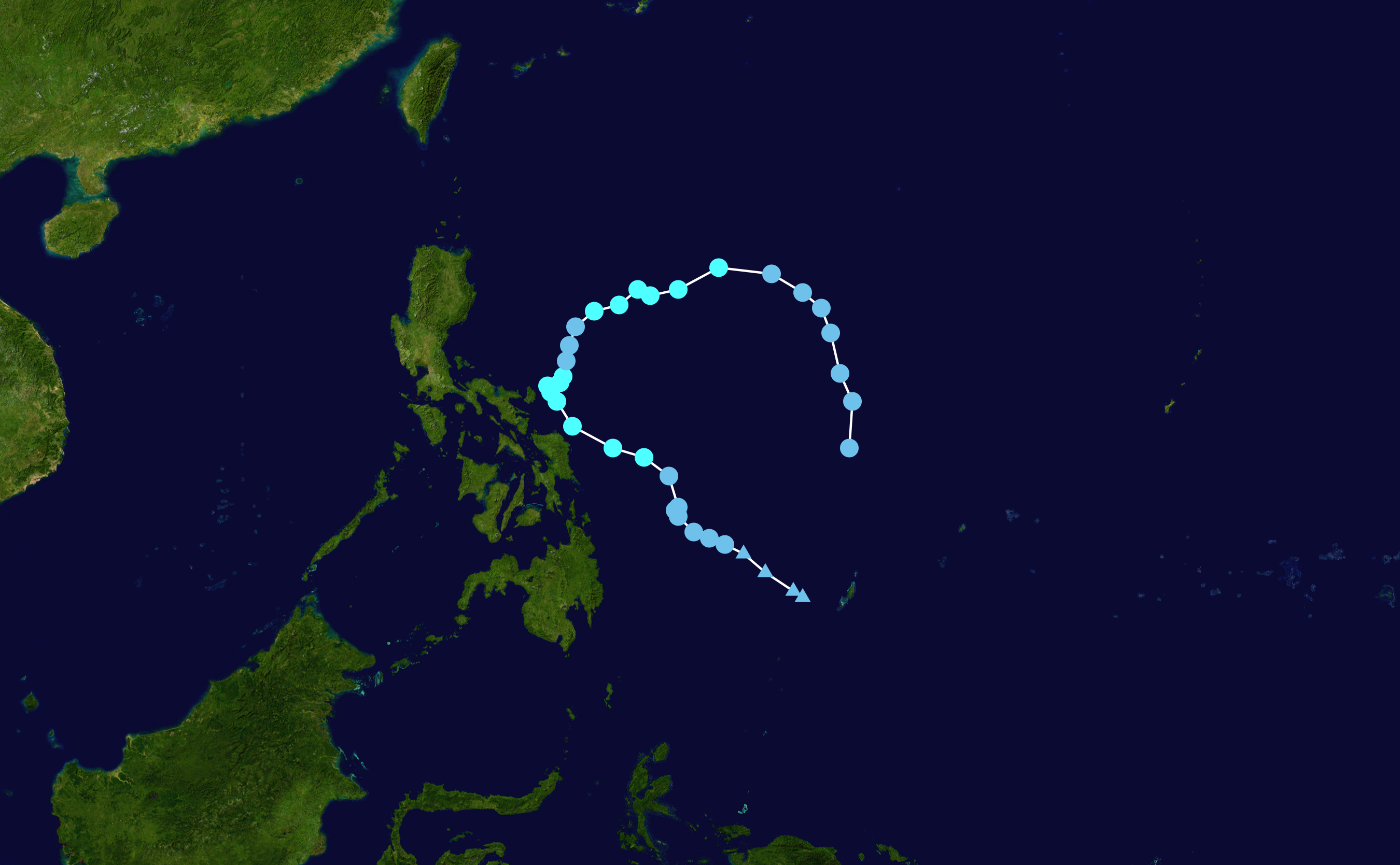
Map plotting the storm's track and intensity, according to the Saffir–Simpson scale Map key Saffir–Simpson scale Tropical depression (≤38 mph, ≤62 km/h) Tropical storm (39–73 mph, 63–118 km/h) Category 1 (74–95 mph, 119–153 km/h) Category 2 (96–110 mph, 154–177 km/h) Category 3 (111–129 mph, 178–208 km/h) Category 4 (130–156 mph, 209–251 km/h) Category 5 (≥157 mph, ≥252 km/h) Unknown Storm type Tropical cyclone Subtropical cyclone Extratropical cyclone, remnant low, tropical disturbance, or monsoon depression

At 12:00 UTC on January 13, the JMA discovered a low-pressure area south of Palau. Due to high sea surface temperatures, tropical cyclone heat potential, weak vertical wind shear, and good outflow, the system continued to intensify as it moved northwest along the southern portion of a subtropical high. At 01:30 UTC on January 14, the JTWC issued a Tropical Cyclone Formation Alert for the system, citing a consolidated low-level circulation center (LLCC) with deep convection in the western and southern quadrants. The JTWC identified a marginally favorable environment for the storm to strengthen. The JTWC designated the storm 01W. At 11:00 PHT (03:00 UTC), PAGASA officially upgraded the system into a tropical depression, giving it the name Ada. Limited firmness of the storm's structure halted growth as it started shifting west-northwest, having a relatively disorganized LLCC with flaring convection in the northern semicircle. At 18:00 UTC, the system continued to develop. The JTWC reported a better organized LLCC with an improved upper-level environment.

On January 15, limited firmness of the storm's structure caused it to maintain its intensity. A tongue of dry air within the southern quadrant prevented deep convection and, therefore, additional development. At 06:00 UTC, the system continued developing and was upgraded into a tropical storm by the JMA, attaining the name Nokaen. Due to more dry air wrapping around the vortex from the south, little to no convective activity was discovered in that quadrant. At 17:00 PHT (09:00 UTC), PAGASA reported Nokaen's intensification into a tropical storm. Even though Nokaen was in a favorable environment for development, it still maintained its intensity as it remained stationary along the southern periphery of a subtropical high. The JTWC reported a fully exposed low-level circulation center with convection far northwest; the convection attempted to form in the center but was hindered by easterly wind shear. The vortex was described as shallow and quasi-stationary. At 03:00 UTC on January 16, the JTWC upgraded Nokaen into a tropical storm, with a favorable environment and a burst of deep convection; the vortex remained shallow despite the "half-hearted" attempt at intensifying.

Convection started improving in the northwest periphery of Nokaen, with the southern and eastern portions of the LLCC exposed due to persistent easterly shear. A microwave image showed low-level cloud lines wrapped around the center. Deep convection started obscuring the LLCC as the vortex attempted to become more symmetrical; convective activity started increase over the past six hours. The structure of the system had become better over the past 12 hours. Low vertical wind shear contributed to intensification. Nokaen started consolidating further while flare-ups of hot and cold convection took effect throughout the central dense overcast. The system started becoming more vertically stacked. The majority of convection remained relegated to the northwest quadrant as deep convection continued to burst close to the surface circulation; white low-level cloud lines were also seen wrapping beneath the convection in the southern quadrant as two distinct outflow channels emerged in the last 12 hours. Along Nokaen's northwestern flank and through an eastward convective band, deep convection has continued to widen, causing the LLCC to become obscured; the outflow channels persisted.

Nokaen had a broad and poorly defined LLCC as remaining deep convection was left within the northern semicircle. Dry air entering the core of the vortex caused central deep convection to be put on hold. On January 18, Nokaen had only a shallow LLCC and minimal convection exclusive to the western periphery. Eventually, the LLCC had become increasingly exposed and elongated as convection remained relatively displaced within the north. Through this, the JTWC identified marginally unfavorable conditions.

== Preparations ==
In its first bulletin, on January 14 at 11:00 PHT (03:00 UTC), PAGASA raised a Tropical Cyclone Wind Signal No. 1 for the areas of Bucas Grande Island, Dinagat Islands, Eastern Samar, Northern Samar, Samar, Siargao Island, Surigao del Norte, and Surigao del Sur, and later that day for Sorsogon, and the southeastern portion of Albay. On January 15, the aforementioned signal was further issued for the eastern portions of Biliran, Leyte, Southern Leyte, Catanduanes, the eastern portion of Camarines Sur, in Burias Island, Ticao Island, the rest of Albay and Biliran, the eastern portion of mainland Masbate, the northern and central portions of Leyte, and the southern portion of Camarines Sur. A Signal No. 1 warning was further issued on January 16 for the eastern portion of Camarines Norte, the rest of Camarines Sur, the northern portion of Cebu, and the Camotes and Bantayan Islands. At 23:00 PHT (15:00 UTC) that same day, the eastern portion of Camarines Sur, Catanduanes, Albay, Northern Samar, the northern portion of Eastern Samar, and the northeastern portion of Samar were added to Signal No. 2. On January 17, the eastern portion of Quezon, the Polillo Islands, Marinduque, the eastern portion of Romblon, the southeastern portion of Isabela, and Aurora were added to Signal No. 1 while the eastern portion of Camarines Norte was added to Signal No. 2. Eventually, at 23:00 PHT (15:00 UTC), only Catanduanes and the eastern portion of Camarines Sur remained in Signal No. 2.

According to the NDRRMC, a total of 31 seaports were deemed non-operational on January 15. The DSWD declared a blue alert—the second stage of emergency alerts for an approaching storm—leading to the preparation of 2.7 million family food packs across the nation. After PAGASA warned of lahar due to heavy rains near Mount Mayon, local disaster management officials in Albay initiated mandatory evacuation measures for areas prone to lahar, flooding, and landslides. The DSWD Bicol Regional office was put on red alert status and prepared 171,408 family food packs and more than 13,000 non-food items. The DSWD mobile assets were deployed to evacuation centers in the region. All disaster response agencies in Catanduanes were fully mobilized and on alert for Nokaen, with preparedness measures being the focus of a meeting led by Governor Patrick Azanza. The PCG district in Southeastern Mindanao placed its duty response group in heightened alert after many provinces in Mindanao were placed in Signal No. 1.

== Impact ==
At noon on January 16, 5,376 passengers, 2,191 rolling cargoes, and 21 vessels were stranded in seaports. Five hours later, the number increased to 6,064 stranded passengers, 2,352 rolling cargoes, and 37 stranded vessels. On January 17, the tally grew to 8,800. A total of 832,986 people were affected, and 60,384 people were displaced by the storm in Calabarzon, Bicol Region, Eastern Visayas, Negros Island, and Caraga. The Department of Social Welfare and Development (DSWD) gave a ₱43.14 million (US$875,939.09) worth of assistance provided to the affected families, local government units, and other partners.

Light to moderate rainfall was felt in Cagayan de Oro, prompting monitoring of major watershed areas. Heavy rains brought by Nokaen revived fears for 2,000 Kanlaon evacuees in La Castellana. Sixteen domestic flights, coming from Cebu, Siargao, Davao City, and the Clark International Airport operated by Cebu Pacific were grounded due to Nokaen, affecting 1,008 passengers. The Butuan-Surigao national highway was flooded, while landslides affected four barangays in Butuan and Agusan del Norte. In Matnog, Sorsogon, two people died from a rockslide triggered by Nokaen. In Manito, Albay, strong flood currents swept away a bamboo bridge connecting two villages. A spillway in Daraga was made impassable due to flooding.

A total of 12 flooded areas were recorded in the cities and towns of Buenavista, Remedios T. Romualdez, and Tubay in Agusan del Norte, and Butuan. Two landslide incidents were recorded in the towns of Jabonga and Kitcharao in Agusan del Norte. Three areas in Caraga experienced power outages. Numerous areas in Catanduanes experienced landslides and flooding as well. A landslide occurred in Viga, causing police to clean the area. A landslide happened in Panganiban while a mudslide affected citizens in Baras. Heavy rains caused floods in the towns of San Andres, San Miguel, Virac, Pandan, Caramoran, Gigmoto, and Baras. A highway in Baras was completely submerged due to floods. A mudslide incident was reported in San Andres. Spillways in San Miguel and Virac were deemed impassable due to flooding. In Caramoran, heavy rains and winds caused hard visibility as floods submerged schools and cemeteries. Old lahar deposits caused knee-high flooding consisting of sand and rock debris along the Guinobatan-Mayon Road in Guinobatan, trapping some motorists. A road leading to Manila was also flooded. The city government of Maasin, Southern Leyte postponed their "Sakay-Sakay Festival" event to January 25 due to the storm. A barangay in Oras, Eastern Samar suffered a water crisis after major flooding destroyed the village's water system.

== Aftermath ==
The Mayor of Guinobatan ordered road-clearing operations on routes affected by flooding. The local government added that it will continue to monitor affected areas and residents. The DSWD Bicol office assisted the families of the two deaths in the Matnog landslide. Regional Director Norman Laurio said that the office deployed officers to conduct on-site assessments and home visits for the affected households. Crisis Intervection Section (CIS) officers provided psychological aid to help the families cope with the distress. Cash aid was also planned to support immediate needs and daily help.

== See also ==
- 2026 Pacific typhoon season
- Tropical Storm Lingling (2014)
