= Tropical Storm Kajiki (2014) =

Pacific tropical storm in 2014

Tropical Storm Kajiki (Basyang)
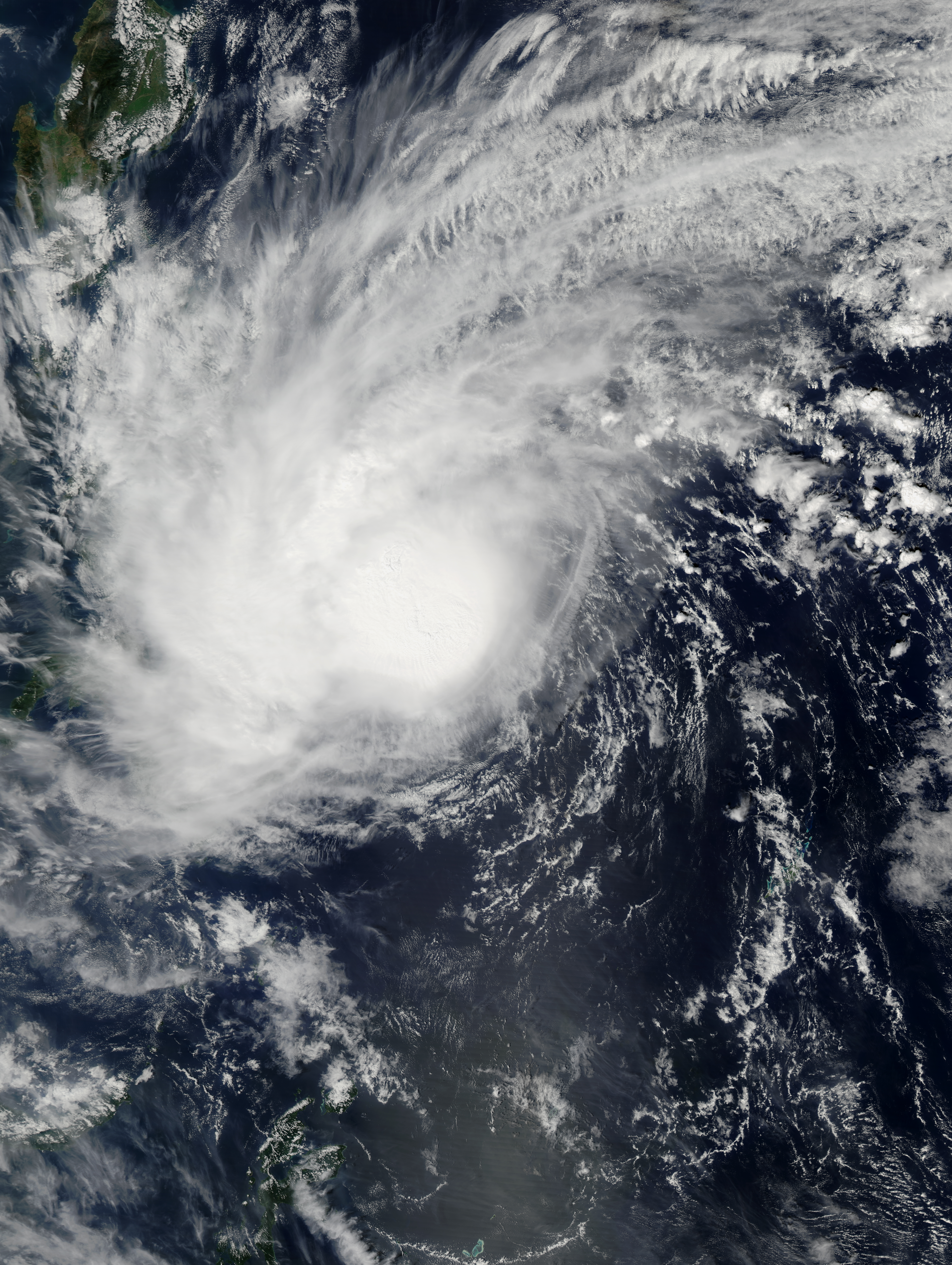
- Tropical Storm Kajiki approaching the Philippines on January 31

Meteorological history
- Formed: January 29, 2014
- Dissipated: February 1, 2014

Tropical storm
- 10-minute sustained (JMA)
- Highest winds: 65 km/h (40 mph)
- Lowest pressure: 1000 hPa (mbar); 29.53 inHg

Tropical storm
- 1-minute sustained (SSHWS/JTWC)
- Highest winds: 65 km/h (40 mph)
- Lowest pressure: 996 hPa (mbar); 29.41 inHg

Overall effects
- Fatalities: 6 total
- Damage: $202,000 (2014 USD)
- Areas affected: Micronesia, Palau, Philippines
- IBTrACS /
- Part of the 2014 Pacific typhoon season

Tropical Storm Kajiki, (Note: The name Kajiki (Japanese: カジキ, [ka̠ʑikʲi]) was contributed by Japan and refers to the constellation Dorado, the swordfish, in Japanese.) known in the Philippines as Tropical Storm Basyang, was a weak tropical cyclone which caused flooding and landslides in central Philippines in late January and early February 2014. The second named storm of the 2014 Pacific typhoon season, Kajiki formed as a tropical depression east of Yap on January 29. The depression moved west-souththwest quickly while slowly gaining strength. On the next day, the depression turned west-northwest and approached the Philippines. Early on January 31, the depression attained tropical storm statue and was given the name Kajiki. Kajiki struck the Philippines later that day and weakened to a tropical depression on February 1 while over the northern Sulu Sea. Kajiki dissipated later that day, after crossing Palawan and emerged into the South China Sea.

Kajiki brought impacts to central Philippines, while some regions were still recovered from impacts by Haiyan three months ago and Lingling less than two weeks ago. PSWS was issued to numerous provinces in Visayas, Mindanao, and Mimaropa. Thousands of people were evacuated to flee the storm. Flights and sea transport were cancelled due to adverse weather, which stranded over 9,000 people. Schools in Cebu suspended classes on February 1 because of Kajiki. Heavy rains from the storm triggered flash flood and landslides in Visayas, which displaced hundreds of families and disrupted land transport. Kajiki killed six people and injured another one, most of the casualties were in Cebu. Damages across the Philippines reached Php9.14 million (US$202 thousand).

== Meteorological history ==
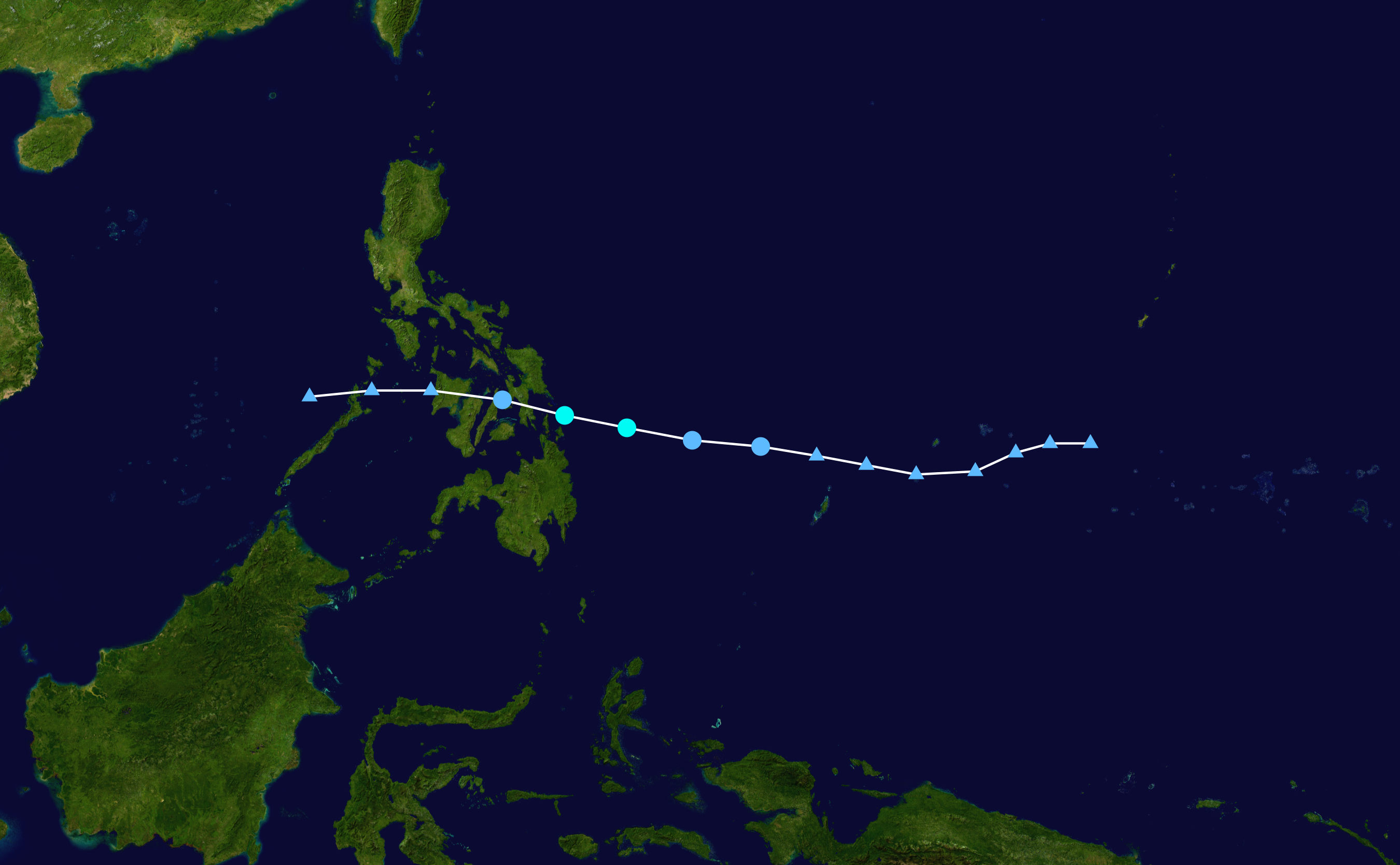
Map plotting the storm's track and intensity, according to the Saffir–Simpson scale Map key Saffir–Simpson scale Tropical depression (≤38 mph, ≤62 km/h) Tropical storm (39–73 mph, 63–118 km/h) Category 1 (74–95 mph, 119–153 km/h) Category 2 (96–110 mph, 154–177 km/h) Category 3 (111–129 mph, 178–208 km/h) Category 4 (130–156 mph, 209–251 km/h) Category 5 (≥157 mph, ≥252 km/h) Unknown Storm type Tropical cyclone Subtropical cyclone Extratropical cyclone, remnant low, tropical disturbance, or monsoon depression

On January 29, the Japan Meteorological Agency (JMA) first noted a tropical depression formed about 545 km (339 mi) east of Yap. Deep convection developed over the northern part of the center, though moderate wind shear prohibited significant development. On the next day, the depression entered the Philippine Area of Responsibility (PAR). The Philippine Atmospheric, Geophysical and Astronomical Services Administration (PAGASA) assigned the local name Basyang and began monitoring the system. Despite the center became slightly elongated, the Joint Typhoon Warning Center (JTWC) still classified the system as a tropical depression, and assigned as 02W. The system tracked generally westward at a relatively fast pace, under the influence of a subtropical ridge. Early on January 31, the JMA upgraded the system to a tropical storm and assigned the name Kajiki, as deep convection persisted and obscured the center. Continued to move westward, Kajiki struck Siargao Island at 6 p.m. PST (10:00 UTC), the Dinagat Island at 7:45 p.m. (11:45 UTC), and the Panaon Island at 8:30 p.m. (12:30 UTC). The storm made subsequent landfalls in Padre Burgos, Southern Leyte at 9 p.m. (13:00 UTC), in Ubay, Bohol at 10 p.m. (14:00 UTC), in Naga, Cebu at 12 a.m. February 1 (16:00 UTC January 31). Despite interacting with land, strong poleward ourflow enhanced the deep convection. As such, the JTWC upgraded the system to a tropical storm. In the early hours of February 1 (local time), Kajiki made more landfalls in Negros Oriental, Guimaras Island, and southern Iloilo. Kajiki weakened to a tropical depression at 06:00 UTC February 1, shortly before hitting the Calamian Islands and emerged into the South China Sea. The center became ill-defined while deep convection decaying after striking the Philippines. Environment over South China Sea was hostile, Kajiki failed to re-develop, with deep convection faded. The JMA ceased tracking the system later that day, while located midway between Palawan and the Spratly Islands. The JTWC also issued its final warning to the system.

== Preparations and impact ==
Shortly after entering the PAR, the PAGASA issued the PSWS #1 for three provinces in Caraga, Misamis Oriental, and Southern Leyte. The PAGASA issued the PSWS #2 for Eastern Visayas, Cebu, Bohol, and provinces in Caraga after Kajiki strengthened to a tropical storm, while provinces in Northern Mindanao, Zamboanga Peninsula, and Central Visayas was placed under PSWS #1. As Kajiki approached, the PSWS #2 was extended to provinces of Central Visayas, Western Visayas, and northern Palawan, while PSWS #1 was extended to provinces in Mimaropa. The PSWS #2 was cancelled early on February 1, as Kajiki weakened to a tropical depression. All the PSWS were lifted as Kajiki further weakened to a low-pressure area.

The government stayed alert as Kajiki was expected to strike the regions that were heavily impacted by Haiyan in November 2013 and Lingling less than two weeks ago. The PAGASA warned citizens, particularly those who lived in Leyte and Surigao del Norte to be careful about flooding and landslides. 45 domestic flights from Philippine Airlines Express, Cebu Pacific, and AirAsia Zest were cancelled. Sea transport were cancelled, which affected 1,600 people. Fishing vessels and small boats were asked to stop setting out to sea and remained ashore. A total of 9,023 people were stranded due to cancellation of different transports. In Surigao del Norte, 26,435 people were evacuated in advance of the storm, though no flooding was reported in the province. In Tacloban, over 10,000 people were evacuated to the city's Convention Center. Almost 700 families across vulnerable areas in Cebu were evacuated. All schools in the provinces suspended the classes on February 1. Citizens were allowed to go back to their home starting on February 2, as Kajiki weakened and moved away from the Philippines.

Heavy rainfall from Kajiki triggered flash floods and landslides in Southern Leyte. 20 houses were destroyed and a car was washed away by floodwaters. Eight landslides were reported across the province, which blocked the roads and disrupted land transport. The government of the province declared a state of calamity due to the massive impacts from the storm. Landslides were reported in Talisay, Cebu. In Negros Occidental, 793 families were displaced by the flooding. The flooding also affected nearly 2,000 athletes who attended the Batang Pinoy National Championships in Bacolod. Kajiki killed six people and injured another one. A young man was drowned after the boat capsized off the Camotes Islands. An elderly man drowned in Maasin, while another young man in Balamban died due to electrocution. A teenager boy in Samboan died because of landslides. Another elderly man was drowned in Bantayan, Cebu, while a boy in Compostela, Cebu died due to electrocution. Besides, a motorboat sank in waters between the Camotes Islands and Danao, Cebu. Five people on the boat went missing. They were rescued by fishermen off the Pacijan Island. A baby girl in Talisay, Cebu was injured after being hit by a collapsed fence. 47,740 people were affected, while 3,012 of them were displaced after the storm. 427 houses were damaged, in which 33 of them were destroyed. Total damage across the Philippines was Php9.14 million (US$202 thousand), most of them were related infrastructure.

== See also ==
- Other tropical cyclones named Kajiki
- Other tropical cyclones named Basyang
