= List of storms named Lingling =

The name Lingling (Cantonese: 玲玲, [liŋ˨˩ liŋ˨˩]) has been used for five tropical cyclones in the western North Pacific Ocean. The name was contributed by Hong Kong and is a feminine given name meaning "tinkling of a jade" in Cantonese.

- Typhoon Lingling (2001) (T0123, 27W, Nanang) – struck the Philippines and Vietnam, causing extensive damages.
- Tropical Storm Lingling (2007) (T0718, 18W) – churned in the open ocean.
- Tropical Storm Lingling (2014) (T1401, 01W, Agaton) – deadly tropical storm that caused widespread flooding and landslides in Mindanao.
- Typhoon Lingling (2019) (T1913, 15W, Liwayway) – passed through Ryukyu Islands as Category 4 storm and struck North Korea as a typhoon.
- Tropical Storm Lingling (2025) (T2512, 18W, Huaning) – reached tropical storm status just before making landfall in Japan.

Preceded by Podul	Pacific typhoon season names Lingling	Succeeded by Kajiki
