= List of storms named Haiyan =

The name Haiyan (Mandarin: 海燕, [xaɪ˧˩˧ jɛn˥˩]) was used to name three tropical cyclones in the western north Pacific Ocean. The name was contributed by China and means storm petrel in Mandarin.

- Typhoon Haiyan (2001) (T0121, 25W, Maring) – a Category 2 typhoon that affected Taiwan and Ryukyu Islands.
- Tropical Storm Haiyan (2007) (T0716, 27W) – a short-lived tropical storm which initially showed subtropical characteristics.
- Typhoon Haiyan (2013) (T1330, 31W, Yolanda) – an extremely powerful and deadly Category 5-equivalent super typhoon that caused catastrophic destruction in the Philippines, causing at least 6,300 deaths.

The name Haiyan was retired after the 2013 Pacific typhoon season and was replaced with Bailu, which means white deer, an auspicious sign, in Mandarin.
