= Typhoon Krosa (2007) =

Pacific typhoon in 2007

Typhoon Krosa (Ineng)
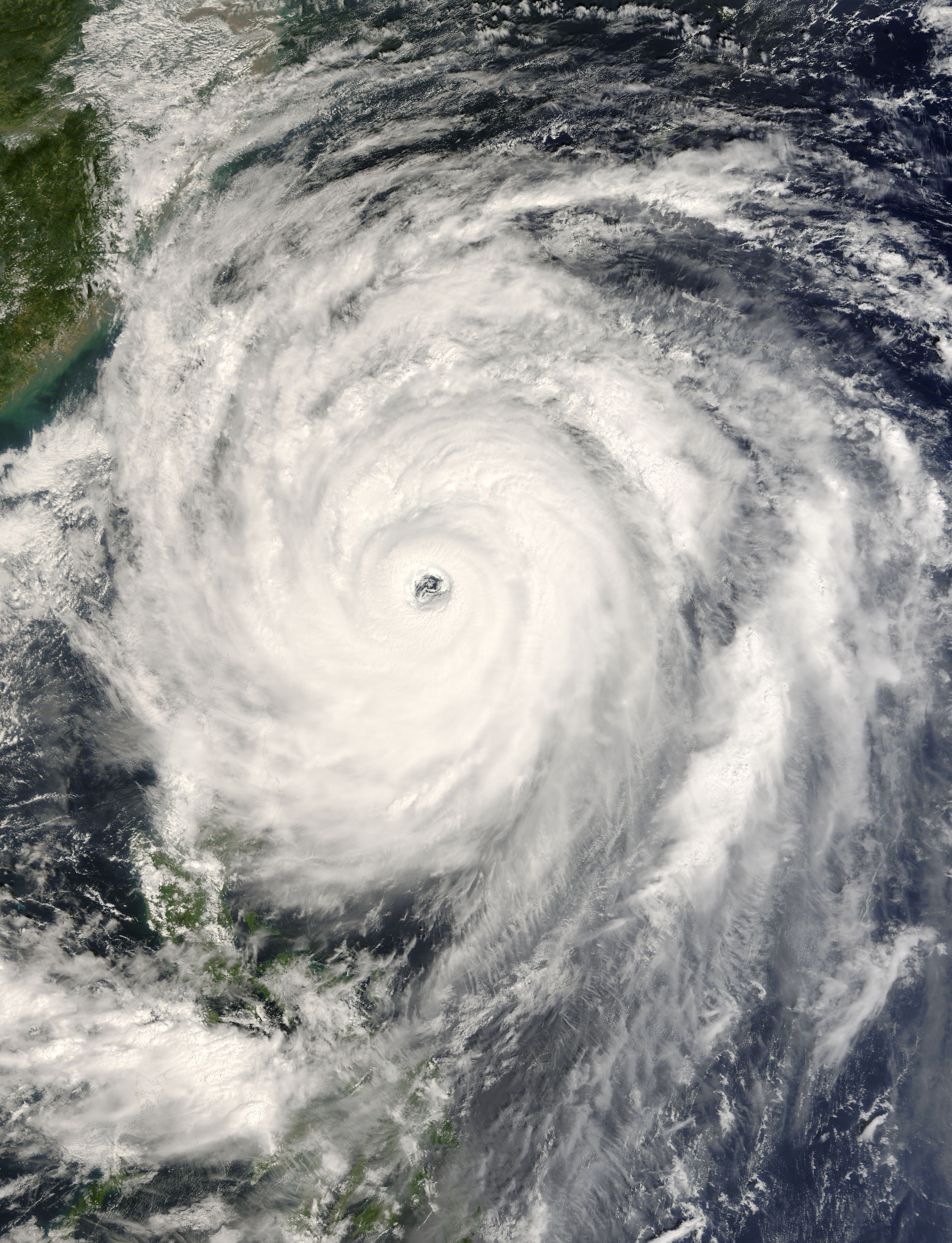
- Typhoon Krosa approaching Taiwan on October 5

Meteorological history
- Formed: October 1, 2007
- Extratropical: October 8, 2007
- Dissipated: October 12, 2007

Violent typhoon
- 10-minute sustained (JMA)
- Highest winds: 195 km/h (120 mph)
- Lowest pressure: 925 hPa (mbar); 27.32 inHg

Category 4-equivalent super typhoon
- 1-minute sustained (SSHWS/JTWC)
- Highest winds: 240 km/h (150 mph)
- Lowest pressure: 926 hPa (mbar); 27.34 inHg

Overall effects
- Fatalities: 5 total
- Damage: $1.7 billion (2007 USD)
- Areas affected: Taiwan, China, Japan
- IBTrACS
- Part of the 2007 Pacific typhoon season

Typhoon Krosa, also known in the Philippines as Super Typhoon Ineng, was a powerful typhoon that impacted both China and Taiwan in early October 2007. The 18th tropical cyclone, the 15th named storm, and the 11th typhoon of the 2007 Pacific typhoon season, Krosa formed from a tropical system east of the Philippines in late September. The system became a depression on October 1, and on the following day, the depression quickly developed into a severe tropical storm. In the following days, Krosa rapidly intensified into a Category 4 super typhoon and reached peak intensity of 105 knots (194 km/h) (in 10-minute winds). Krosa would slowly weaken before making landfall on Taiwan. After making landfall on Taiwan, Krosa quickly weakened into a minimal typhoon, and rapidly weakened into a tropical depression between Zhejiang and Fujian provinces. Krosa transitioned into an extratropical cyclone on October 8. Extratropical remnants of Krosa dissipated on October 12.

In China, Krosa caused large-scale evacuations, but the final impact was minimal. In Taiwan however, Krosa caused 5 deaths.

== Meteorological history ==
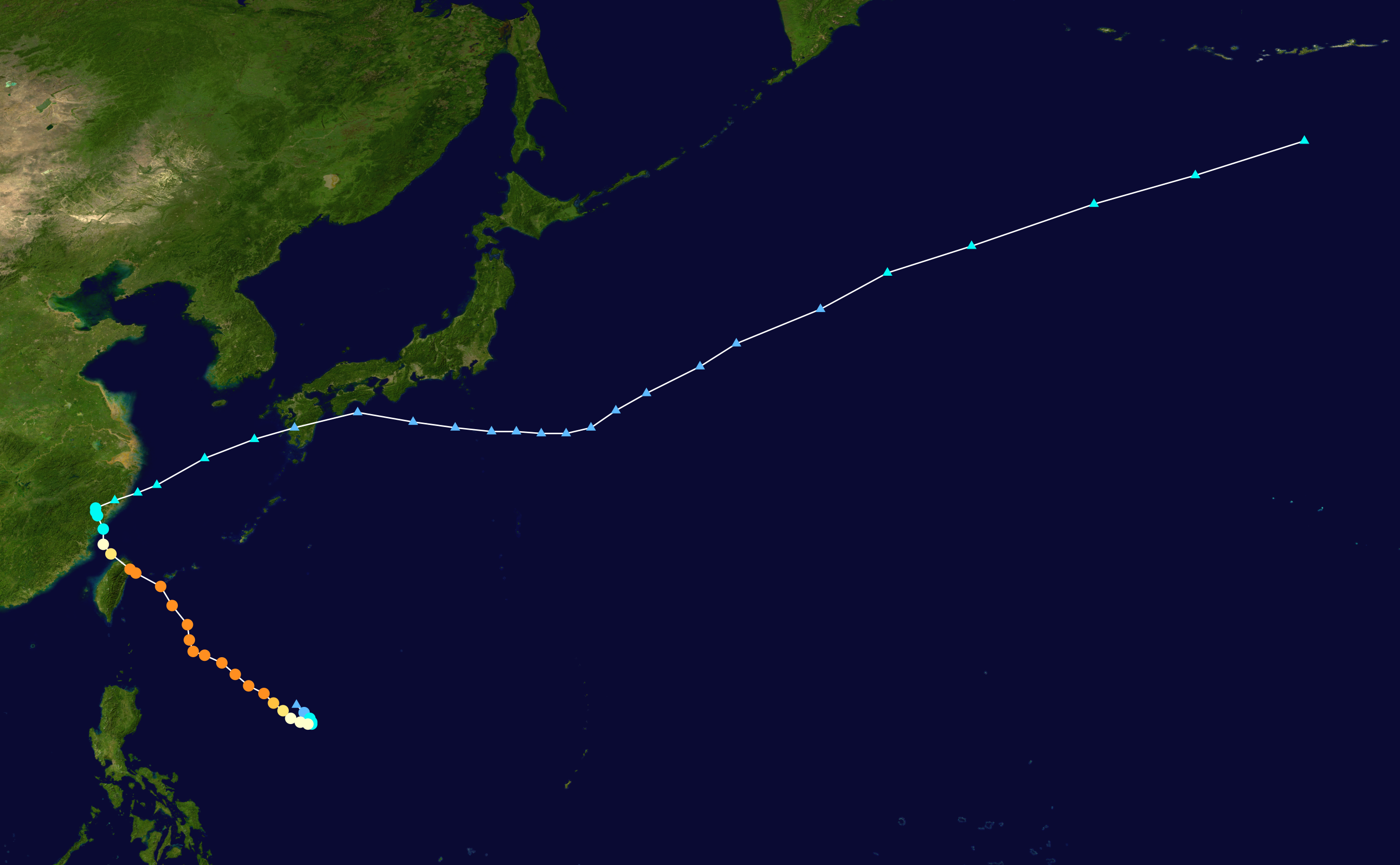
Map plotting the storm's track and intensity, according to the Saffir–Simpson scale Map key Saffir–Simpson scale Tropical depression (≤38 mph, ≤62 km/h) Tropical storm (39–73 mph, 63–118 km/h) Category 1 (74–95 mph, 119–153 km/h) Category 2 (96–110 mph, 154–177 km/h) Category 3 (111–129 mph, 178–208 km/h) Category 4 (130–156 mph, 209–251 km/h) Category 5 (≥157 mph, ≥252 km/h) Unknown Storm type Tropical cyclone Subtropical cyclone Extratropical cyclone, remnant low, tropical disturbance, or monsoon depression

In late September, a new system formed east of the Philippines, leading to a Tropical Cyclone Formation Alert by JTWC. PAGASA declared it a tropical depression and assigned a local name Ineng early on October 1, and the JMA and JTWC soon followed.

It was upgraded to a tropical storm early on October 2 by JMA, receiving the international name Krosa. (Note: The name Krosa (Khmer: ក្រសារ, [krɑ.ˈsaː]) was contributed by Cambodia and means crane in Khmer.) Rapid intensification took place on October 2 and it was upgraded to a typhoon by the JTWC by midday. As it intensified, it gained a wide, ragged eye and began to track to the west, becoming a typhoon by the JMA early on October 3. It continued to rapidly intensify that day before leveling off as a Category 4-equivalent typhoon on October 4. Fluctuations in intensity soon followed as Krosa approached Taiwan, as the JMA upgraded it to 105 knots (194 km/h) and the JTWC into a super typhoon early on October 5. It slowly weakened afterward before making landfall in northeastern Taiwan on October 6. After landfall in Taiwan, Krosa quickly weakened into Category 1 typhoon as it approached China. Krosa would make landfall shortly afterwards between Zhejiang and Fujian around that intensity. JMA downgraded Krosa into a severe tropical storm. Early on October 7, JMA would further downgrade Krosa into a tropical storm, and JTWC followed suit, as Krosa weakened rapidly. Krosa would parallel the coast of China as it turned east-northeast, and emerged in the sea soon after. As sea surface temperatures were cold and could not sustain a tropical cyclone, Krosa began transitioning into an extratropical cyclone. Around noon October 8, JMA published the last tropical cyclone warning on Krosa as it weakened into a tropical depression, and JTWC followed suit six hours later. The extratropical remnants of Krosa crossed the International Dateline on October 12.

== Preparations ==
=== Taiwan ===
Hundreds of thousands of people had to evacuate from the oncoming typhoon. Several flights and transport services were cancelled due to the disruption of the typhoon.

=== China ===
An evacuation of 730,000 people from China's Zhejiang and Fujian provinces was ordered on the evening of October 6. More than 600,000 people evacuated after landfall in China, bringing the total evacuees into 1.4 million people. In Shanghai, 8,800 workers had to stay out of the coasts despite Krosa passing well south of the city, and more than 40 flights to Shanghai were cancelled.

== Impact ==
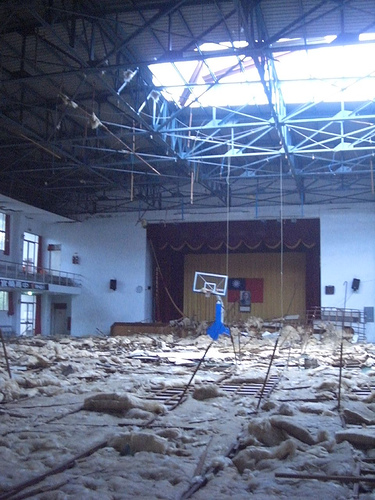
Destroyed sports gym in Taiwan

=== Taiwan ===
Rains from Krosa caused flooding which led to blocked roads along with downed trees. These blocked roads caused the death of a newborn who needed medical attention. Another death was directly caused by landfall, while isolated incidents caused by high winds from the typhoon caused deaths of another two people. Taiwan's National Fire Agency reported that a traffic incident caused another death, bringing the death toll to five people. Additionally, Krosa injured 67 people and knocked out power to another 2 million people when it made landfall as a Category 4 typhoon.

=== China ===
In China, severe structural damage and power outages were reported in the port city of Wenzhou, and 17 people were reported injured. No fatalities were reported. According to Government of China, more than 7.4 million people were affected by the typhoon. Rains and winds from Krosa caused the destruction of 3,500 homes.

== See also ==
- Other tropical cyclones named Krosa
- Other tropical cyclones named Ineng
- Typhoon Wipha (2007)
- Typhoon Bilis (2000)
