= List of storms named Podul =

The name Podul (Korean: 버들, [pɔ̹dɯɭ]) has been used for five tropical cyclones in the western North Pacific Ocean. The name was contributed by North Korea and means willow in Korean.

- Typhoon Podul (2001) (T0122, 26W) – a Category 5 super typhoon that did not affect land.
- Severe Tropical Storm Podul (2007) (T0717) – short-lived storm that remained over the open ocean; not recognized by the JTWC.
- Tropical Storm Podul (2013) (T1331, 32W, Zoraida) – weak storm that affected the Philippines and Vietnam.
- Tropical Storm Podul (2019) (T1912, 13W, Jenny) – made landfall in the province of Aurora, Philippines, and then in Vietnam.
- Typhoon Podul (2025) (T2511, 16W, Gorio) – a strong Category 2 typhoon that struck Southern Taiwan and Fujian, China.

Preceded by Bailu	Pacific typhoon season names Podul	Succeeded by Lingling
