= List of storms named Bailu =

List of storms with the same or similar names

The name Bailu (Mandarin: 白鹿, [paɪ̯˧˥ lu˥˩]) has been used to name two tropical cyclones in the western North Pacific Ocean. The name was contributed by China and refers to a "white deer", an auspicious sign, in Mandarin. It replaced the name Haiyan, which was retired following the 2013 Pacific typhoon season.

- Severe Tropical Storm Bailu (2019) (T1911, 12W, Ineng) – a severe tropical storm that hit Taiwan and China.
- Tropical Storm Bailu (2025) (T2510, 13W) – a minimal tropical storm that passed east of Japan.

Preceded by Krosa	Pacific typhoon season names Bailu	Succeeded by Podul
