= List of storms named Krosa =

The name Krosa (Khmer: ក្រសារ, [krɑ.ˈsaː]) has been used for five tropical cyclones in the western North Pacific Ocean. The name was contributed by Cambodia and means "crane" in Khmer.

- Typhoon Krosa (2001) (T0120, 24W) – a category 3 typhoon that never affected land.
- Typhoon Krosa (2007) (T0715, 17W, Ineng) – a category 4 Super Typhoon that struck Taiwan and China.
- Typhoon Krosa (2013) (T1329, 29W, Vinta) – a category 3 typhoon that struck the Philippines and affected Vietnam.
- Typhoon Krosa (2019) (T1910, 11W) – a very large category 3 typhoon that struck Japan later as a tropical storm.
- Typhoon Krosa (2025) (T2509, 12W) – a category 1 typhoon that minimally affected Japan later as a tropical storm.

Preceded by Co-May	Pacific typhoon season names Krosa	Succeeded by Bailu
