= Typhoon Lingling (2001) =

Pacific typhoon in 2001

Typhoon Lingling (Nanang)
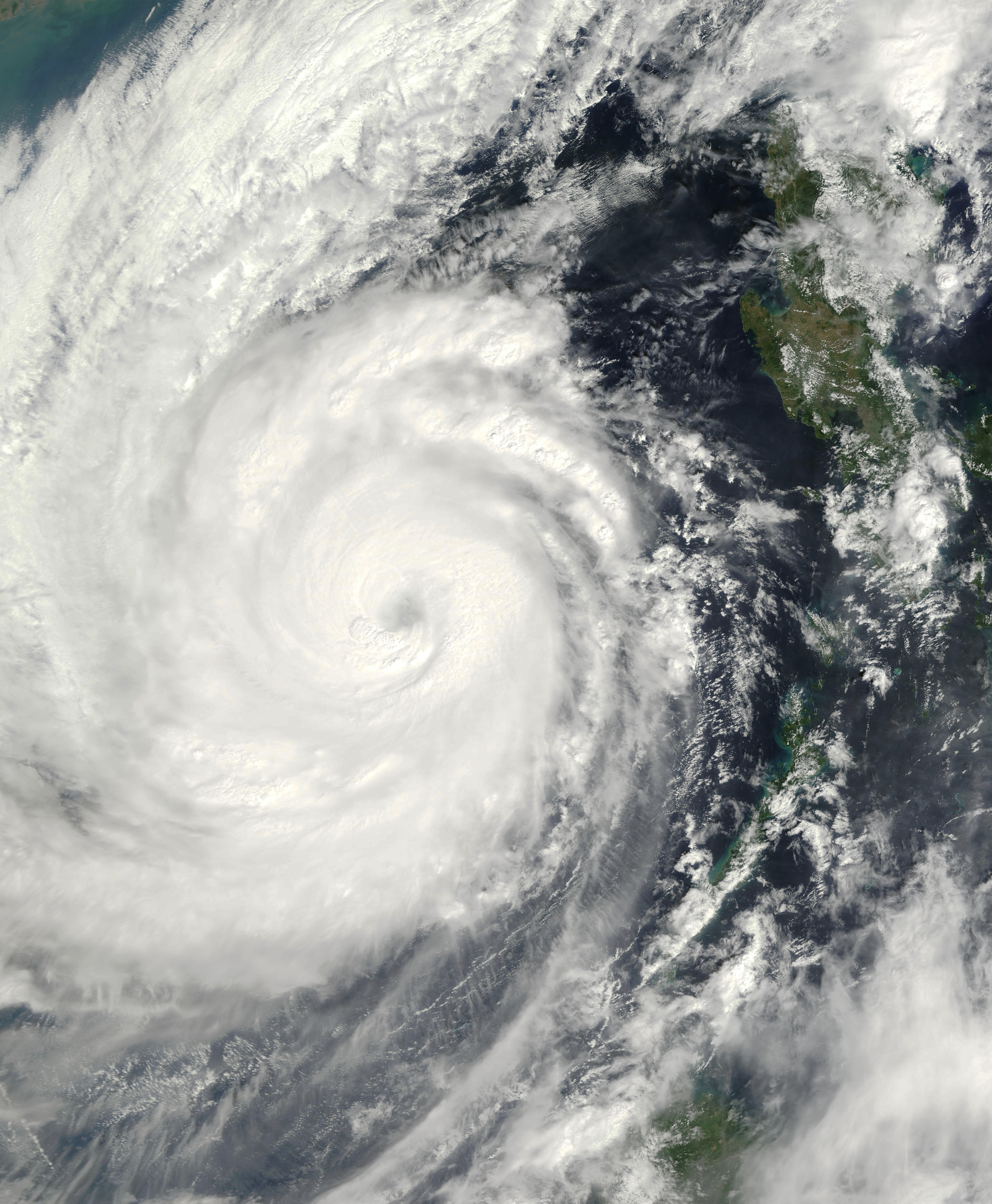
- Typhoon Lingling in the South China Sea on November 10

Meteorological history
- Formed: November 6, 2001
- Dissipated: November 12, 2001

Very strong typhoon
- 10-minute sustained (JMA)
- Highest winds: 155 km/h (100 mph)
- Lowest pressure: 940 hPa (mbar); 27.76 inHg

Category 4-equivalent typhoon
- 1-minute sustained (SSHWS/JTWC)
- Highest winds: 215 km/h (130 mph)
- Lowest pressure: 927 hPa (mbar); 27.37 inHg

Overall effects
- Fatalities: 379 total
- Damage: $60 million (2001 USD)
- Areas affected: Philippines, Vietnam and Cambodia
- IBTrACS
- Part of the 2001 Pacific typhoon season

Typhoon Lingling, known in the Philippines as Typhoon Nanang, was a deadly typhoon that struck the Philippines and Vietnam in early-November 2001 and caused 379 deaths. The 39th tropical depression, 22nd named storm, and 13th typhoon of the 2001 Pacific typhoon season, Lingling developed into a tropical depression on November 6 and given the local name Nanang by the PAGASA. The next day, it was upgraded into a tropical storm and given the name Lingling by the Japan Meteorological Agency (JMA). Lingling's intensity briefly stagnated as it moved over Visayas before resuming intensification and intensifying into a severe tropical storm on November 8. One day later, both the JMA and the Joint Typhoon Warning Center (JTWC) upgraded Lingling to a typhoon as it exited the Philippine archipelago and moved into the South China Sea. After intensifying into a typhoon, Lingling began to quickly intensify, peaking with 10-min sustained winds of 155 km/h (96 mph) and 1-min sustained winds of 215 km/h (134 mph), with a minimum central pressure of 940 mbar (28 inHg). Lingling began to weaken as it approached the Vietnamese coast, before making landfall on November 11 at 18:00 UTC. Lingling rapidly weakened afterward, dissipating on November 12.

A total of 379 people were killed, of which 359 came from the Philippines and 20 came from Vietnam. The province of Camiguin was the most heavily affected, with multiple landslides killing hundreds of people. Lingling caused a total of $60 million in damage.

== Meteorological history ==
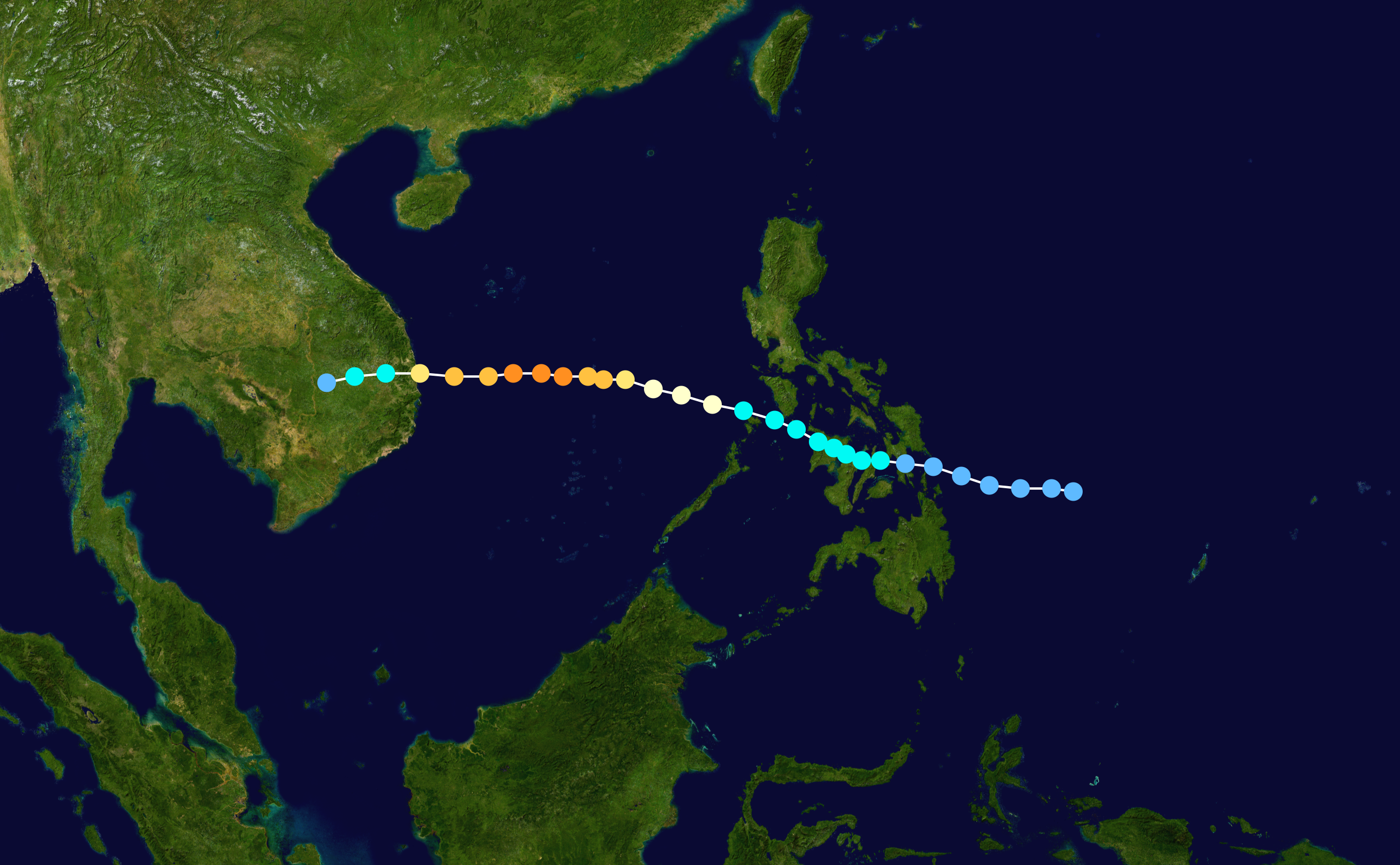
Map plotting the storm's track and intensity, according to the Saffir–Simpson scale Map key Saffir–Simpson scale Tropical depression (≤38 mph, ≤62 km/h) Tropical storm (39–73 mph, 63–118 km/h) Category 1 (74–95 mph, 119–153 km/h) Category 2 (96–110 mph, 154–177 km/h) Category 3 (111–129 mph, 178–208 km/h) Category 4 (130–156 mph, 209–251 km/h) Category 5 (≥157 mph, ≥252 km/h) Unknown Storm type Tropical cyclone Subtropical cyclone Extratropical cyclone, remnant low, tropical disturbance, or monsoon depression

At 19:00 UTC on November 3, the Joint Typhoon Warning Center (JTWC) began monitoring an area of convection approximately 120 nm east-southeast of Yap, assessing its development potential as poor due to infrared satellite imagery indicating disorganized convection. Surface analysis the next morning showed that the disturbance was located within a monsoon trough without a closed circulation, though the convection was located within a favorable for intensification. The next day on November 5 at 6:00 UTC, the JTWC upgraded its development potential to fair as satellite imagery showed multiple low-level circulations within a broader circulation. The disturbance continued organizing, and on the same day at 20:30 UTC, the JTWC issued a Tropical Cyclone Formation Alert (TCFA) on the system. On November 6 at 0:00 UTC, the Japan Meteorological Agency (JMA), the PAGASA, and the JTWC began issuing warnings on a tropical depression that had formed about 750 km (470 mi) southeast of Manila, with the JTWC giving it the designation 27W and the PAGASA giving it the local name Nanang.

The JTWC and the PAGASA estimated the depression's strength at 50 km/h (31 mph), though by 6:00 UTC the PAGASA had upgraded it to a tropical storm as the system's organization began to improve. By 12:00 UTC, the JTWC had increased the system's intensity to 55 km/h (34 mph) as it began approaching Leyte Gulf, and at 18:00 UTC on November 6, the JMA upgraded the depression to a tropical storm, giving it the name Lingling, (Note: The name Lingling (Cantonese: 玲玲, [liŋ˨˩ liŋ˨˩]) was contributed by Hong Kong and is a feminine given nickname meaning "tinkling of a jade" in Cantonese.) with the JTWC doing so later at 0:00 UTC on November 7 as its center was located over Cebu. Lingling continued to the west-northwest, primarily steered by a mid-level high situated over northern Vietnam and southern China. Lingling's intensity briefly stagnated as its center moved over Negros Island and Panay before resuming intensification, with the JTWC estimating winds of 85 km/h (53 mph) on November 8 at 0:00 UTC. By 12:00 UTC the same day, the JTWC had upgraded the storm's strength to 105 km/h (65 mph), with the JMA upgrading Lingling to a severe tropical storm 6 hours later, estimating a minimum central pressure of 980 mbar (hPa; 28.94 inHg) as it entered the South China Sea. Lingling continued intensifying, and by November 9, the JTWC and the JMA upgraded Lingling to a typhoon, with the JMA doing so later in the day.

After Lingling intensified into a typhoon, it began to quickly intensify as it tracked along the southern edge of a strong monsoonal northeasterly surge. Convective coverage began to increase and become more organized and by November 9 at 18:00 UTC, the JTWC assessed Lingling's maximum sustained winds at 165 km/h (103 mph) as it began to turn westward, before further intensifying into a Category-3 equivalent cyclone on November 10 at 0:00 UTC. Later that day at 12:00 UTC, the JTWC unofficially estimated Lingling to have peaked, with 1-min sustained winds of 215 km/h (134 mph) and a minimum central pressure of 927 mbar (27.4 inHg). The JMA estimated Lingling to have peaked 12 hours later on November 11 at 0:00 UTC, with 10-min sustained winds of 155 km/h (96 mph) and a minimum central pressure of 940 mbar (28 inHg). Gales from the storm extended 170 nm in all quadrants, with it extending up to 250 nm in the northwestern quadrant; the eye's diameter at this time was 25 nm. Lingling then began to weaken thereafter, with the JMA downgrading it to a severe tropical storm and the JTWC downgrading it to a Category-2 equivalent cyclone as it made landfall near Qui Nhơn on November 11 at 18:00 UTC. After making landfall, Lingling rapidly weakened, with the JMA downgrading it to a tropical depression and the JTWC downgrading it to a tropical storm on November 12 at 0:00 UTC. The JTWC issued its final warning on the system hours later at 6:00 UTC, with the JMA doing the same at 12:00 UTC. Lingling degenerated into an area of low pressure over northern Cambodia the same night.

== Impact ==
=== Philippines ===
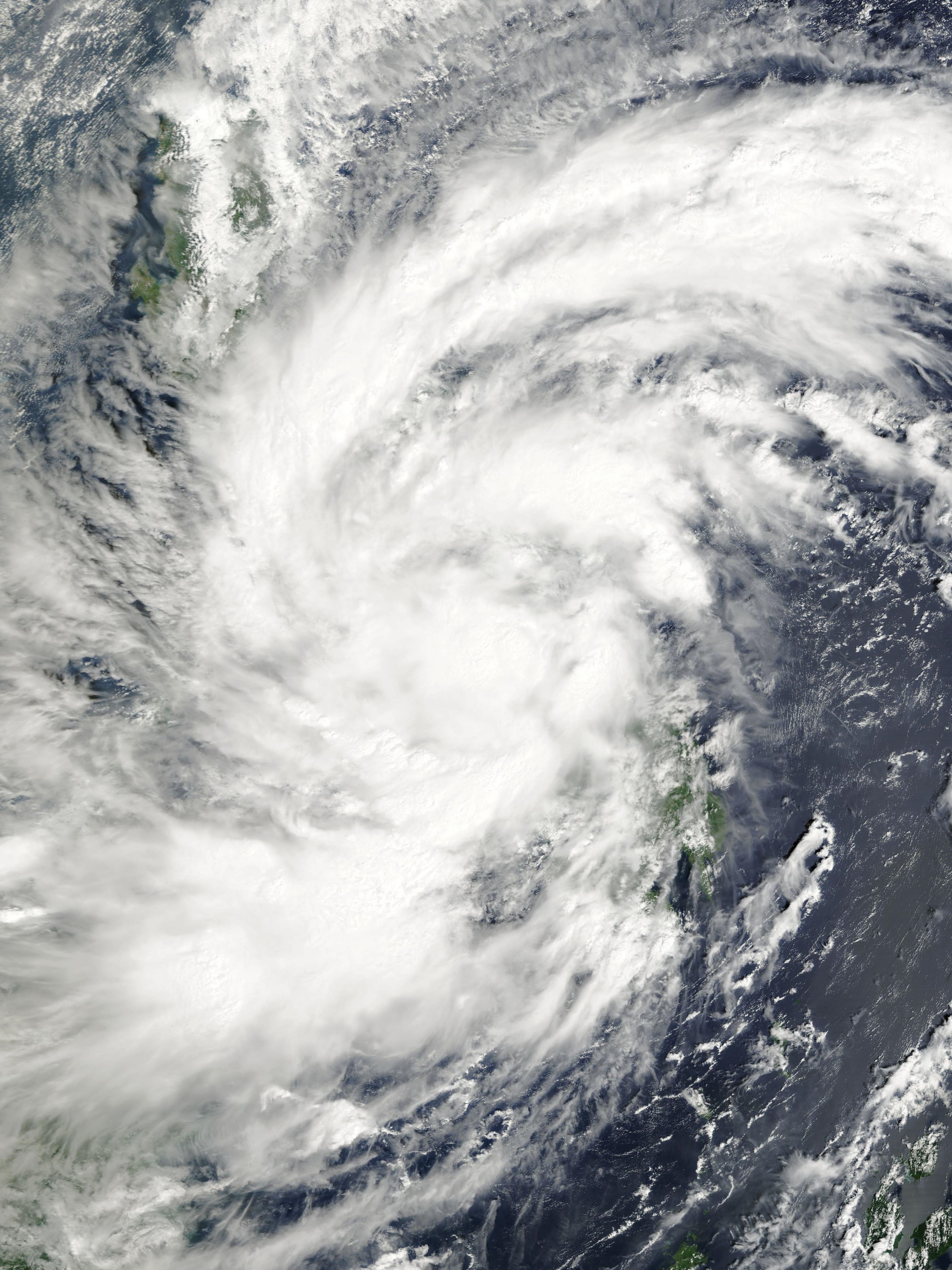
Lingling over the Philippines as a tropical storm on November 7

A majority of the fatalities in the Philippines came from the municipality of Mahinog in Camiguin, where landslides, debris flows, and flash floods flattened hundreds of shanties. 15 people died in Cebu, of which 11 died due to a tunnel collapse in a copper mine. Another 10 people drowned on Negros Island, with another person being killed in Bohol. A Panamanian cargo vessel sank off the coast of Pangasinan, with the 19 people on board being reported missing.

A state of calamity was declared in the provinces of Negros Occidental, Capiz, Aklan, Antique, and Camiguin due to extensive damages to property and loss of life by President Gloria Macapagal Arroyo on November 26. In total, 359 people were killed (of which 229 presumed dead) and 147 were injured. Lingling caused $22.7 million in the Philippines.

==== Camiguin ====
Rainfall of 517 millimeters was observed on November 7, with 7 thousand families in Camiguin being affected. The Philippine Tactical Operations command conducted relief operations on Camiguin, though many government agencies including the Armed Forces of the Philippines were unable to land on the island due to bad weather. Lingling effectively isolated Camiguin for 2 weeks, with the future governor Jurdin Jesus Romualdo describing it as "the worst crisis that we had in Camiguin in recent history." The Hubangon and Pontod river basins in Camiguin suffered the most serious damage. Several people died in floods, with other people being struck by fallen trees and debris caused by a tornado hitting the island. There were fears of disease outbreaks due to lack of clean drinking water and cases of diarrhea in evacuation centers.

=== Vietnam ===
The maximum sustained wind speeds recorded during the impact of Typhoon Lingling in Vietnam were 32 m/s (115 km/h) in Tuy Hoà (Phú Yên) [vi], 28 m/s (101 km/h) on Lý Sơn Island, 21 m/s (76 km/h) in Hoài Nhơn (Bình Định), and 17 m/s (61 km/h) in Quy Nhơn (Bình Định). From 19:00 ICT on 10 November to 13:00 ICT on 12 November, rainfall in some areas exceeded 200 mm, with 253 mm recorded in Tam Kỳ (Quảng Nam) and 243 mm in Tuy Hoà.

In Phú Yên Province, 15 people were killed, with Bình Định Province and Quảng Ngãi receiving 2 fatalities each, and 1 person being killed in Thừa Thiên Huế Province. In total, 20 people were killed, 131 were injured, with Lingling causing $37.3 million in damages in Vietnam.

== Aftermath ==
The local name Nanang was retired and replaced with Nando for the 2005 season due to the damages it caused in the Philippines.

== See also ==
- Other tropical cyclones named Lingling
- Typhoon Kalmaegi (2025) - a deadly typhoon that also had similar track and intensity with Lingling.
