= List of storms named Kajiki =

The name Kajiki (Japanese: カジキ, [ka̠ʑikʲi]) has been used to name five tropical cyclones in the western North Pacific Ocean. The name was contributed by Japan and refers to the constellation Dorado, the swordfish, in Japanese.

- Tropical Storm Kajiki (2001) (T0124, 30W, Quedan) – a weak tropical storm that traversed through the Philippines.
- Typhoon Kajiki (2007) (T0719, 19W) – struck Iwo Jima.
- Tropical Storm Kajiki (2014) (T1402, 02W, Basyang) – a storm which headed towards the Philippines, killing 6 people.
- Tropical Storm Kajiki (2019) (T1914, 16W, Kabayan) – an erratic storm which affected Vietnam, and caused flooding in the Philippines.
- Typhoon Kajiki (2025) (T2513, 19W, Isang) – a Category 2-equivalent typhoon that skirted Hainan Island and made landfall in Vietnam.

| Preceded by Lingling | Pacific typhoon season names Kajiki | Succeeded by Nongfa |
