= Tropical Storm Megi =

Pacific tropical storm in 2022

Tropical Storm Megi (Agaton)
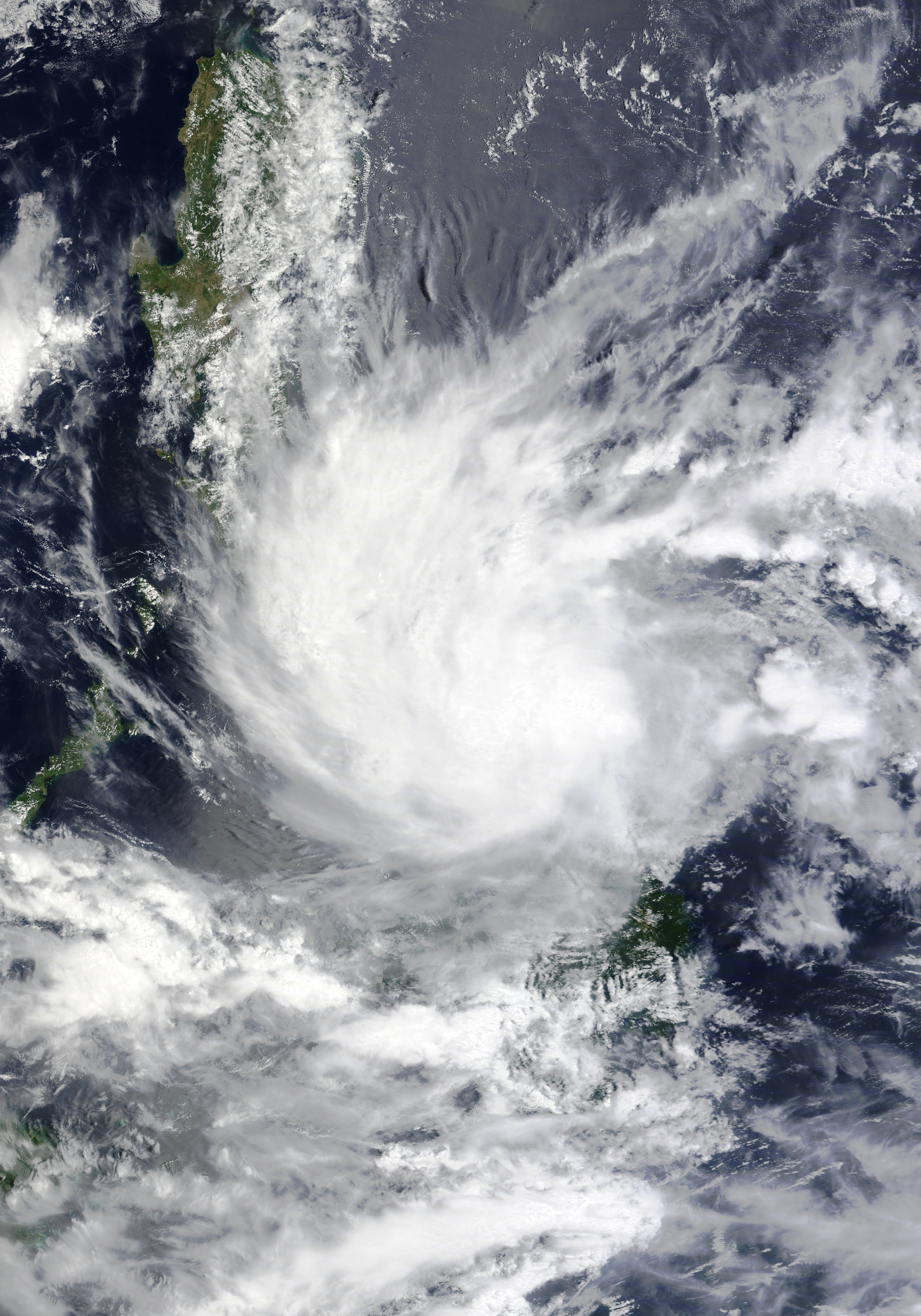
- Megi at peak intensity while approaching Visayas on April 10

Meteorological history
- Formed: April 8, 2022
- Dissipated: April 12, 2022

Tropical storm
- 10-minute sustained (JMA)
- Highest winds: 75 km/h (45 mph)
- Lowest pressure: 996 hPa (mbar); 29.41 inHg

Tropical storm
- 1-minute sustained (SSHWS/JTWC)
- Highest winds: 75 km/h (45 mph)
- Lowest pressure: 999 hPa (mbar); 29.50 inHg

Overall effects
- Fatalities: 214
- Missing: 132
- Damage: $200 million (2022 USD)
- Areas affected: Philippines
- IBTrACS /
- Part of the 2022 Pacific typhoon season

Tropical Storm Megi, (Note: The name Megi (Korean: 메기, [ˈme̞(ː)ɡi]) was contributed by South Korea and refers to the Amur catfish (Silurus asotus) in Korean.) known in the Philippines as Tropical Storm Agaton, (Note: The Japan Meteorological Agency (JMA) assigns names to typhoons in the western Pacific Ocean and north of the equator, as the Regional Specialized Meteorological Centre. PAGASA assigns local names to tropical cyclones in the Philippine Area of Responsibility.) was a weak and rather short-lived but deadly tropical cyclone that impacted the Philippines in mid-April 2022. The third tropical depression and second named storm of the 2022 Pacific typhoon season, Megi originated from an area of convection in the Philippine Sea. It slowly tracked northwestward into Leyte Gulf, where it remained almost stationary, gradually tracking eastward. The storm made two landfalls, one in Calicoan Island in Guiuan, and another in Basey, Samar. It continued to track southwestward and reentered the Philippine Sea before dissipating.

Heavy rains and gales led to the sinking of two ships. Major landslides pushed mud over villages in Leyte, burying around 210 houses. As of April 29, the Philippines' National Disaster Risk Reduction and Management Council (NDRRMC) has reported 214 deaths, 132 missing, and 8 injured. The Department of Agriculture estimates worth ₱3.27 billion in agricultural damages, and the Department of Public Works and Highways estimates worth ₱1.45 billion in infrastructural damages, for a total of ₱4.72 billion (US$90.8 million). These currently differ from the damages reported by the NDRRMC, which remain at ₱2.27 billion (US$43.7 million).

== Meteorological history ==
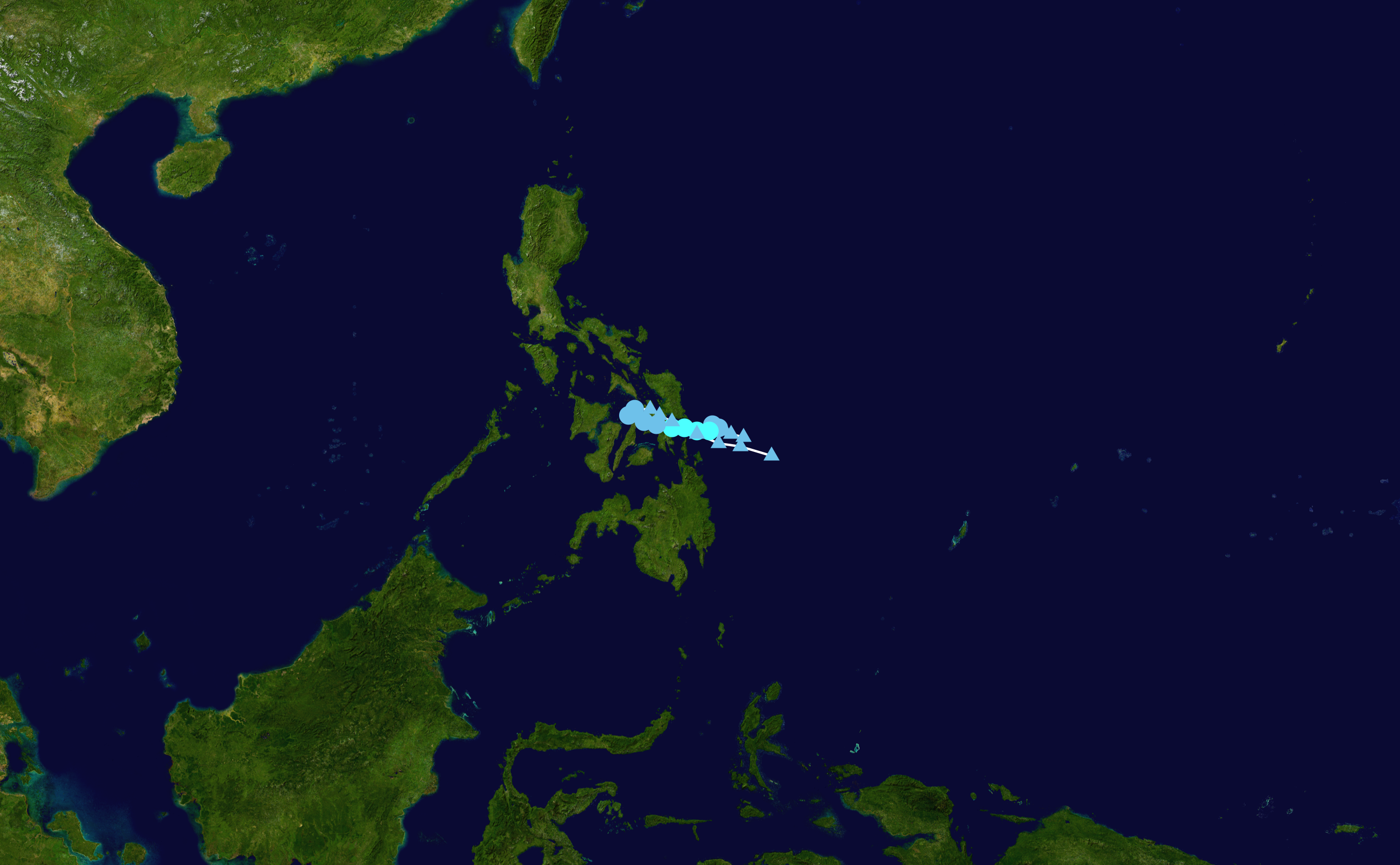
Map plotting the storm's track and intensity, according to the Saffir–Simpson scale Map key Saffir–Simpson scale Tropical depression (≤38 mph, ≤62 km/h) Tropical storm (39–73 mph, 63–118 km/h) Category 1 (74–95 mph, 119–153 km/h) Category 2 (96–110 mph, 154–177 km/h) Category 3 (111–129 mph, 178–208 km/h) Category 4 (130–156 mph, 209–251 km/h) Category 5 (≥157 mph, ≥252 km/h) Unknown Storm type Tropical cyclone Subtropical cyclone Extratropical cyclone, remnant low, tropical disturbance, or monsoon depression

A satellite loop of Tropical Storms Megi (left) and Malakas (right) on April 9–10.

On April 8, a tropical disturbance developed near 10.7°N 127.1°E, around 359 nautical miles (665 km; 413 mi) west-northwest of Palau. The Japan Meteorological Agency (JMA) began tracking the disturbance as a tropical depression later that day. Around the same time, the Philippine Atmospheric, Geophysical and Astronomical Services Administration (PAGASA) reported that the system had developed into a tropical depression, was named Agaton by the agency. The PAGASA began issuing Tropical Cyclone Bulletins (TCBs) for the storm later that day.

On April 9, the Joint Typhoon Warning Center (JTWC) later issued a Tropical Cyclone Formation Alert (TCFA) for the system. The system's broad low-level circulation center further consolidated and by 03:00 UTC, the agency upgraded it to a tropical depression and assigned it the designation 03W.

Prior to and in the early hours of April 10, the JMA, JTWC, and PAGASA upgraded the system to a tropical storm, with the JMA assigning the name Megi for the storm. Although the environment's conditions were generally favorable for development, the system only maintained its strength across the day as it began interacting with land.

Megi made its first landfall over Calicoan Island, Guiuan at 07:30 PHT on April 10 (23:30 UTC, April 9). Weak steering winds made the storm almost stationary over Leyte Gulf while maintaining its 35-knot (65 km/h; 40 mph) winds near its center. The limited development prompted downgrades of the system to a tropical depression by the JTWC on 21:00 UTC, and by the PAGASA on 08:00 PHT (00:00 UTC) on April 11. After a few hours of slow, northwestward movement, the storm made its second landfall over Basey, Samar around 16:00 PHT (08:00 UTC). Shortly after, the JTWC issued its final warning for the storm.

Megi continued to slowly meander the Leyte–Samar area, driven by conflicting trade winds and westerlies. As the storm further deteriorated under the influence of land, the JMA issued its final advisory for the storm at 06:00 UTC on April 12. The PAGASA also issued its final bulletin for the storm soon after as it further weakened into a low-pressure area. Megi continued to track southeastward and reentered the Philippine Sea around 18:00 UTC. The JMA continued to monitor the system until it was last noted at 06:00 UTC on April 13.

== Preparations ==
=== Highest Tropical Cyclone Wind Signal ===
Highest Tropical Cyclone Wind Signal issued by PAGASA for Megi (Agaton) in each province. The white line represents the best track.

Upon Megi's developing into a tropical depression, the PAGASA immediately began issuing Signal No. 1 warnings over Eastern Samar, Siargao, and the Bucas Grande and Dinagat Islands. The agency also began raising Signal No. 2 warnings and expanded its bubble of areas under Signal No. 1 after it developed into a tropical storm. Classes and work in Danao, Cebu were suspended as early as April 10.

On April 11, classes in Cebu City, Lapu-Lapu City, Mandaue, Talisay, Carcar, and Tacloban were all suspended. Classes were also suspended in the entire province of Southern Leyte and in parts of Negros Occidental. Cebu City and Tacloban also suspended work in both government and private sectors, and began evacuating residents near rivers and shorelines. The Department of Foreign Affairs suspended operations for two of their consular offices in the affected areas. According to the NDRRMC, 33,443 people were preemptively evacuated.

PLDT and Globe Telecom, both Philippine telecommunications companies, prepared free calling and charging stations ahead of the storm. On April 12, the Department of Social Welfare and Development (DSWD) announced that it had prepared ₱13.2 million (US$254,049) worth of family food packs, with an additional ₱26.7 million (US$513,462) worth of non-food items.

== Impact ==
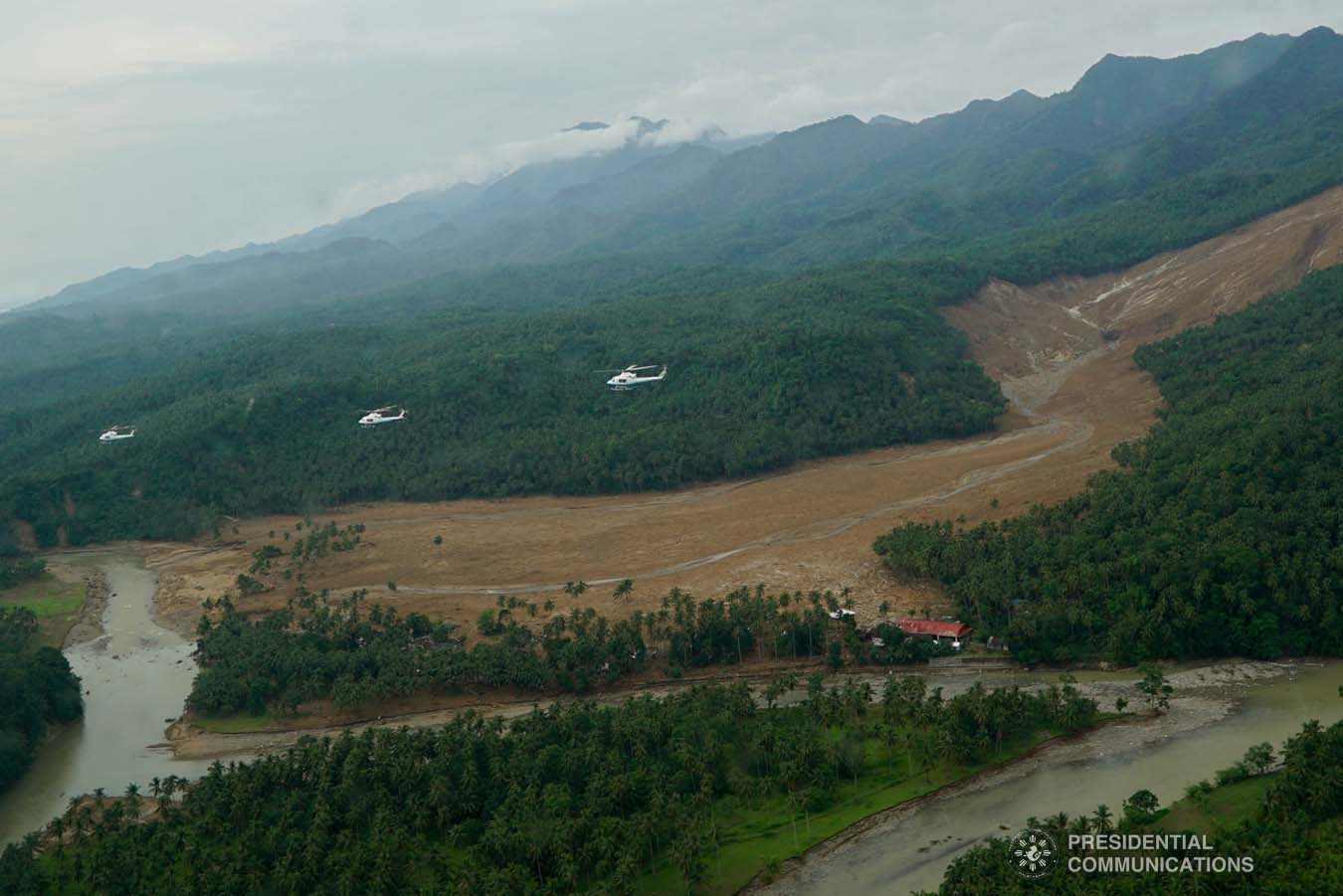
Aerial photo shows a landslide in Baybay, Leyte.

Most of Megi's damages were concentrated in the Visayas region, where the storm lingered for most of its lifespan. Persistent heavy rains, flash flooding, and strong winds led to widespread floods and landslides across the two regions. Some of the areas affected by Megi were recently hit by Typhoon Rai, and were only beginning to recover prior to Megi's impact.

On April 10, heavy waves tipped over a roll-on/roll-off vessel in San Francisco, Cebu, causing it to sink, and also capsized a cargo vessel in Ormoc. Travelers going home for Holy Week in Eastern and Central Visayas were stranded in ports due to the severe weather conditions. A total of around 8,769 passengers were stranded in the western regions of the Philippines. Power outages were reported in 76 cities and municipalities. The outages also affected services for telecommunications companies in the area. As of April 29, 2022, floods still persist in at least 261 areas across Visayas and Mindanao.

The NDRRMC reported 2,298,780 affected people, 886,822 of which were displaced from their homes. The agency also reports a total 214 dead, 132 left missing, and 8 injured as of April 29, 2022. In Baybay, the city reported a total of 101 deaths, 102 left missing, and 103 injured, with a landslide covering an entire barangay of 210 households in mud. In Pilar, Abuyog, 26 people were killed, 96 were injured, 150 were left missing, and 80 percent of houses were buried. The Ministry of Social Services and Development in the Bangsamoro reported at least 136,000 affected people in the Bangsamoro Special Geographic Area (geographically in Cotabato). On April 21, the NDRRMC incorrectly reported 224 deaths after some of the bodies found were duplicated in their latest report.

Agricultural damages are estimated by the NDRRMC at ₱2.27 billion, with infrastructural damages estimated at ₱6.95 million. In addition, 16,382 houses were damaged (with 2,258 houses totally destroyed), causing an additional estimated ₱709,500 in damages. In total, the NDRRMC estimates at least ₱2.27 billion (US$43.7 million) in damages due to Megi. The Department of Agriculture estimates a higher damage toll for the agricultural sector, reaching over ₱3.27 billion. The Department of Public Works and Highways also reports a higher damage to infrastructure; estimating around ₱1.45 billion, for a total of ₱4.72 billion (US$90.8 million) in damages.

== Aftermath ==
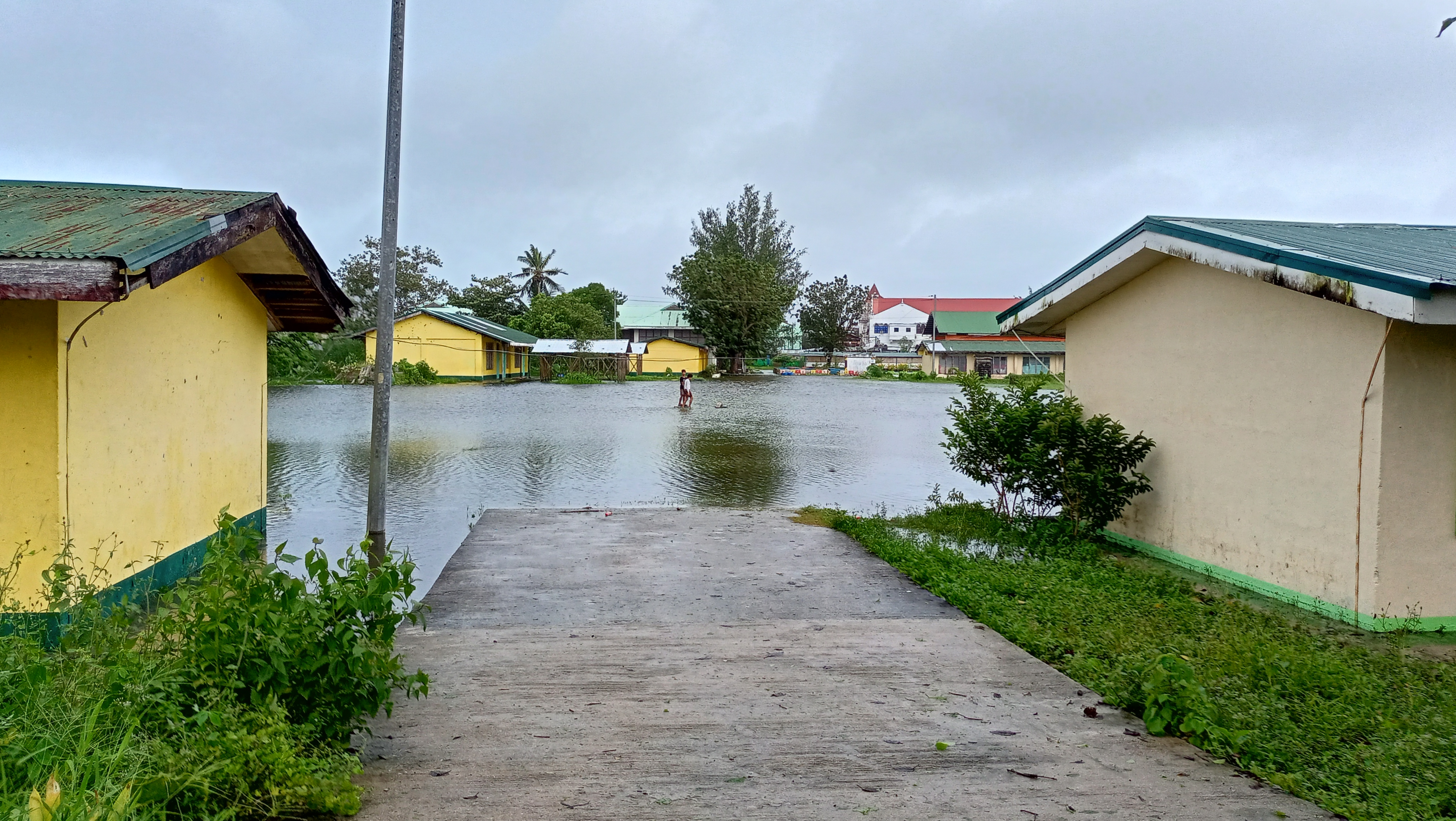
A flooded school in Guiuan, Eastern Samar on the aftermath of Tropical Storm Megi.

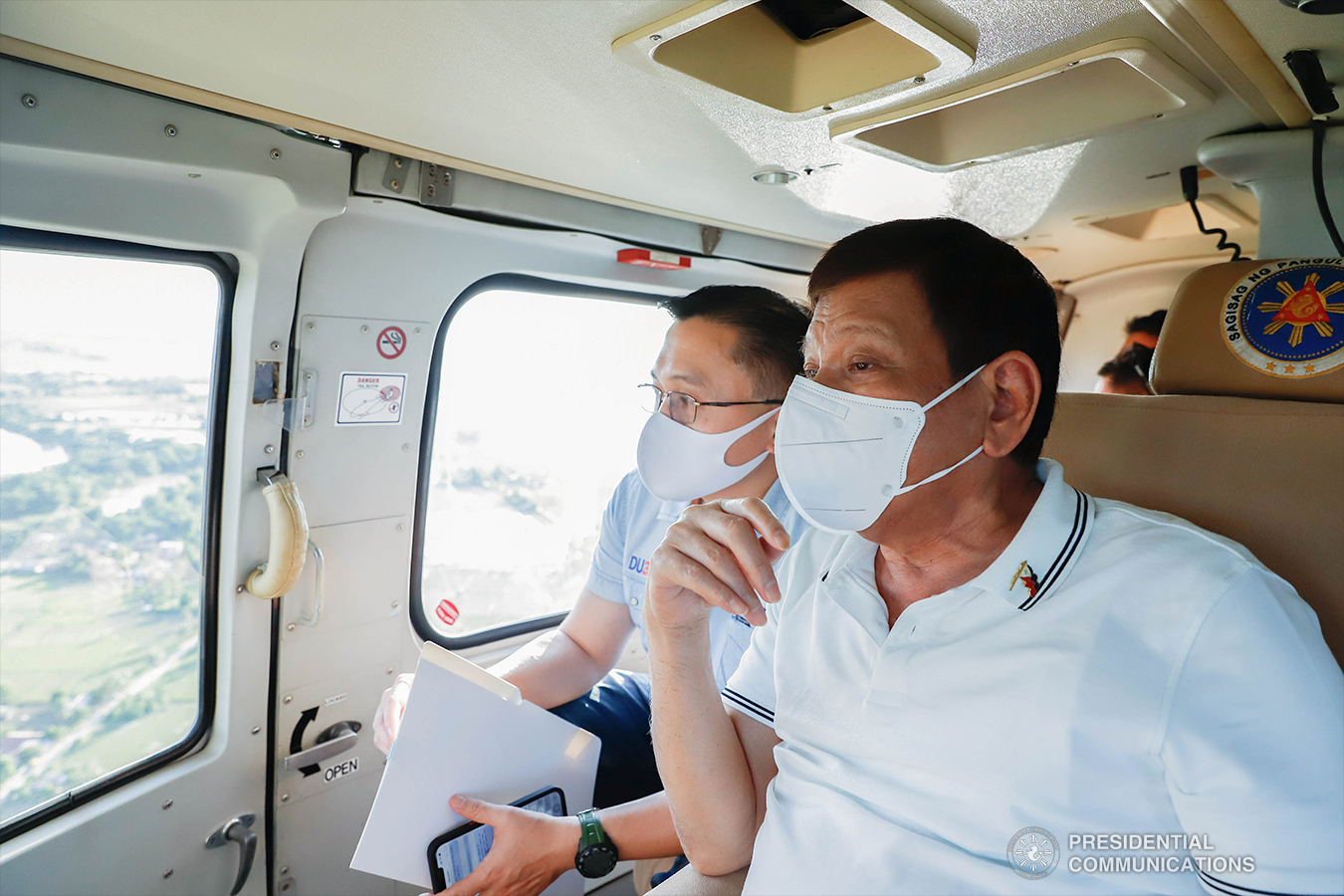
President Rodrigo Duterte and Senator Bong Go during an aerial inspection of areas affected by Tropical Storm Megi in Capiz on April 16, 2022

Searches for survivors by local government units began by April 12 for areas hit by landslides, but was hampered by the severe weather and unstable ground. The Philippine Red Cross also begun search and rescue operations in the landslide-hit areas in Leyte. Survivors of landslides also began salvaging the remains of their houses. 61 areas declared a state of calamity, including the entire province of Davao de Oro.

The storm made its impact during the campaign period for the 2022 Philippine general election, wherein a resolution passed by the Commission on Elections (COMELEC) prohibited the release and expenditure of public funds for any government body or public official, limiting relief operations and the aid that could be immediately provided without the need for an appeal. In a televised interview, COMELEC commissioner George Garcia said that petitions from areas hit by Megi will be expedited. The Office of the Vice President under presidential candidate Leni Robredo, which was exempt from the prohibition, began coordinating with local government units and sent aid for affected communities on April 11. Distribution of relief packs were also facilitated through the DSWD, which was also exempt from the prohibition, instead of the local government units. The municipality of Guiuan announced the intent to file an appeal to the COMELEC. Additionally, presidential candidates Bongbong Marcos and Manny Pacquiao also stated the intent to file petitions for exemption in order to provide aid for affected areas. Despite the damages, the COMELEC assured that the election on May 9 will proceed as planned, with makeshift voting centers to be made in affected areas.

Private individuals and organizations also began donation drives for the affected areas. Volunteer organizations began relief operations, with some donation drives posted on social media under various hashtags. Reservists were also deployed to assist with aid distribution and preparation and with search and retrieval efforts.

President Rodrigo Duterte and Senator Bong Go visited Leyte and Capiz on April 15, where they performed aerial inspections of the landslide-hit areas and participated in the distribution of relief goods. Duterte and Go also visited the Western Leyte Provincial Hospital to meet those injured by the storm. In a press briefing held in Baybay, Duterte promised housing for victims after they have resettled, but mentioned that it would be a “a long, long process and not an easy one unless there’s a miracle.”

The Department of Energy (DOE) announced a 15-day price freeze for liquefied petroleum gas and kerosene products in areas under a state of calamity on April 14, but specifically allowed price rollbacks. The DOE later expanded the price freeze on April 21 to cover more areas. As of April 29, 2022, the NDRRMC reports that assistance and relief goods worth ₱119 million (US$2.28 million) have been distributed to affected families.

Chinese Ambassador to the Philippines Huang Xilian announced that China had donated US$200,000 towards relief operations. Pope Francis and South Korean President Moon Jae-in also expressed their solidarity and condolences to the affected.

== Retirement ==
After the season, the Typhoon Committee announced that the name Megi, along with five others will be removed from the naming lists. In 2024, the name was replaced by Gosari for future seasons, which is a Korean food for young stem of fernbrake (known as fiddlehead of brackens).

After the season, PAGASA announced that the name Agaton will be removed from their naming lists after the storm caused over ₱1 billion in damage, alongside the high death toll that occurred during its onslaught in the country. On May 5, 2023, PAGASA chose the name Ada to replace Agaton for the 2026 season.

== See also ==
- Weather of 2022
- Tropical cyclones in 2022
- Tropical Storm Rumbia (Toyang, 2000) – a weak tropical storm which generally affected the same areas in late-2000
- Tropical Depression Winnie (2004) – a short-lived tropical cyclone which caused landslides that killed nearly 1,600 people in November 2004
- Typhoon Haiyan (Yolanda, 2013) - an extremely destructive and deadly super typhoon that also affected the same areas as Megi, causing massive widespread destruction.
- Tropical Storm Lingling (Agaton, 2014) – a deadly early-season tropical storm also named Agaton by PAGASA; brought heavy rainfall to the eastern part of the Philippines
- Tropical Storm Jangmi (Seniang, 2014) – a weak tropical cyclone that impacted the Philippines in December 2014
- Tropical Storm Kai-tak (Urduja, 2017) – another deadly tropical cyclone that affected Visayas in December 2017
- Typhoon Phanfone (Ursula, 2019) – a strong typhoon in December 2019 that also impacted the same areas
- Typhoon Rai (Odette, 2021) – a violent typhoon that devastated the same areas 4 months earlier
- Typhoon Kalmaegi (Tino, 2025) – a very deadly and strong typhoon that affected the southern Philippines
