= Typhoon Phanfone =

Pacific typhoon in 2019

Typhoon Phanfone (Ursula)
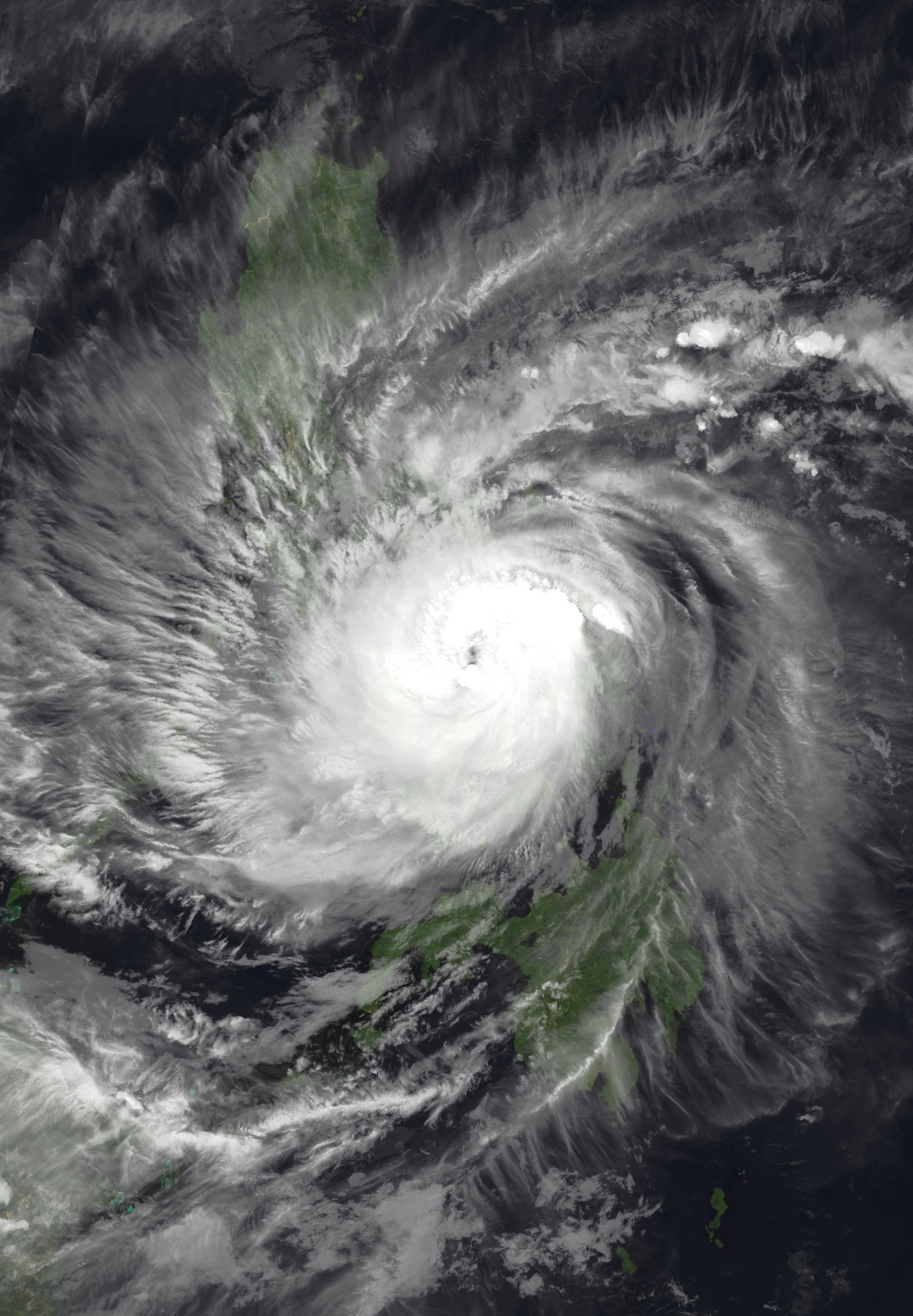
- Phanfone over the Philippines, shortly before its peak intensity, on December 24

Meteorological history
- Formed: December 19, 2019
- Dissipated: December 29, 2019

Typhoon
- 10-minute sustained (JMA)
- Highest winds: 150 km/h (90 mph)
- Lowest pressure: 970 hPa (mbar); 28.64 inHg

Category 3-equivalent typhoon
- 1-minute sustained (SSHWS/JTWC)
- Highest winds: 195 km/h (120 mph)
- Lowest pressure: 958 hPa (mbar); 28.29 inHg

Overall effects
- Fatalities: 50 total
- Injuries: 300
- Missing: 55
- Damage: $67.2 million (2019 USD)
- Areas affected: Philippines
- IBTrACS
- Part of the 2019 Pacific typhoon season

Typhoon Phanfone, (Note: The name Phanfone (Lao: ຟານທອງ, [faːn˧˥ tʰɔːŋ˧˥]) was contributed by Laos and refers to a gold-colored muntjac in Lao.) locally named Ursula, was a strong and deadly tropical cyclone which traversed the Philippines on Christmas Eve and Christmas Day in 2019, the first typhoon to do so since Nock-ten in 2016.

Phanfone was the twenty-ninth and final named storm of the 2019 Pacific typhoon season. The origins of Phanfone can be traced to an upper-level low which had formed near the Caroline Islands and gradually organized into a tropical depression on December 19. Moving generally west-northwestward, the system intensified into a tropical storm on December 22 and moved into the Philippine Area of Responsibility (PAR) on the following day as it continued gaining strength. Phanfone intensified to typhoon status shortly before making its first landfall over the Eastern Visayas region on December 24. Further intensification ensued until Christmas Day despite Phanfone making several landfalls over the central Philippine islands, peaking at 150 km/h (93 mph) 10-minute sustained winds with a central pressure dropping to 970 hPa (29 inHg). Phanfone maintained its typhoon strength for several hours as it exited the Philippines landmass before unfavorable conditions caused it to rapidly deteriorate and dissipate over the South China Sea.

Phanfone crossed the central Philippines after the stronger Kammuri struck nearly the same region merely weeks prior, with a track fairly similar to 2013’s Haiyan. The system caused destruction in the regions of Eastern Visayas, Western Visayas, and Mimaropa. The total fatalities of the said typhoon is 50 deaths (with 55 people missing, and over 300 injured) and the damages is at $67.2 million (2019 US dollars) or roughly ₱3.44 billion.

== Meteorological history ==
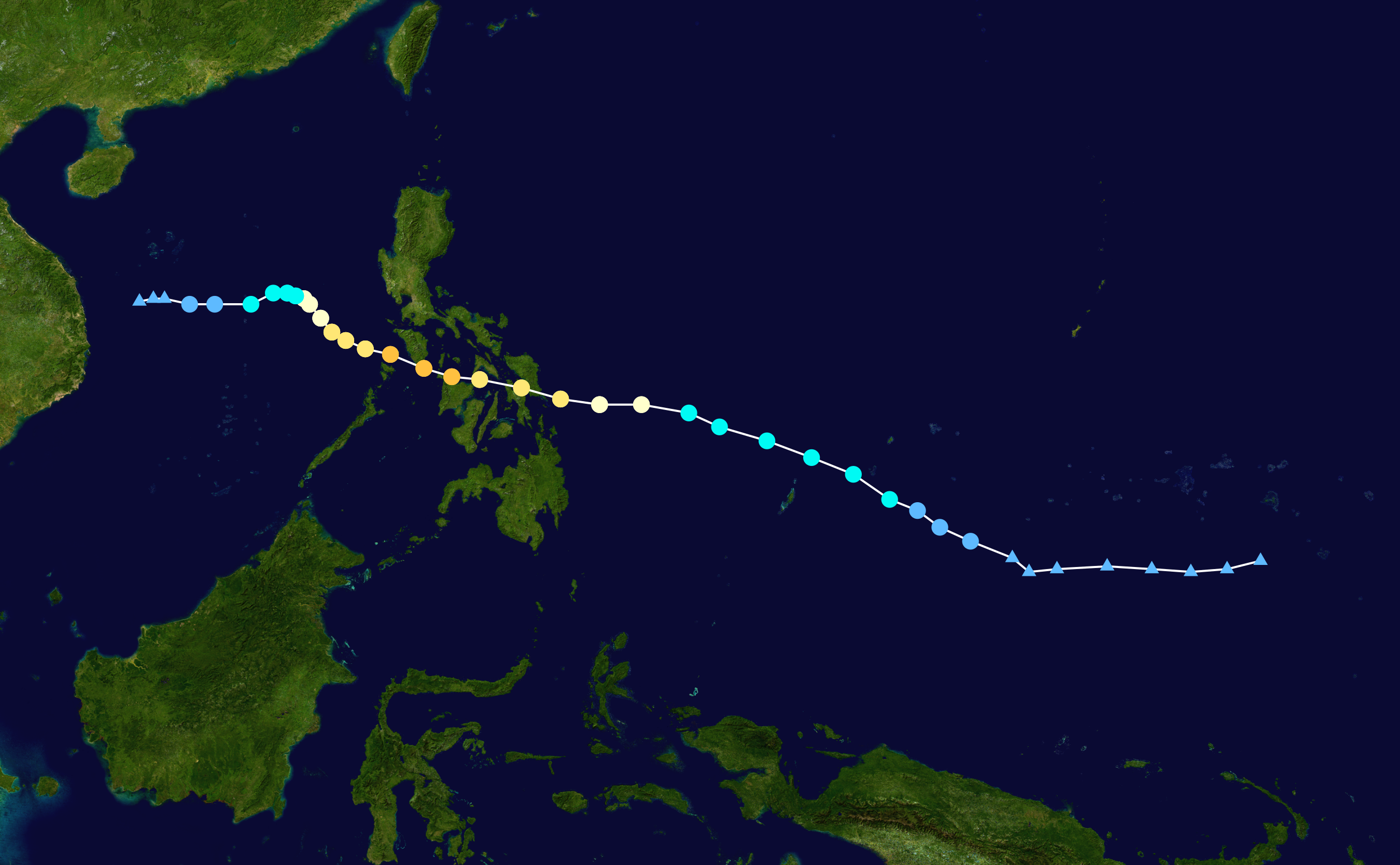
Map plotting the storm's track and intensity, according to the Saffir–Simpson scale Map key Saffir–Simpson scale Tropical depression (≤38 mph, ≤62 km/h) Tropical storm (39–73 mph, 63–118 km/h) Category 1 (74–95 mph, 119–153 km/h) Category 2 (96–110 mph, 154–177 km/h) Category 3 (111–129 mph, 178–208 km/h) Category 4 (130–156 mph, 209–251 km/h) Category 5 (≥157 mph, ≥252 km/h) Unknown Storm type Tropical cyclone Subtropical cyclone Extratropical cyclone, remnant low, tropical disturbance, or monsoon depression

Prior to its formation on December 19, the Joint Typhoon Warning Center (JTWC) began monitoring a low pressure system to the southeast of Micronesia. Showing signs of convection and sufficient banding around a defined center, the JTWC subsequently upgraded its initial warning to a medium chance of development. Shortly thereafter on December 20, JTWC issued a tropical cyclone formation alert, while the Japan Meteorological Agency (JMA) issued its first advisory on the system. By December 22, the system gained tropical storm strength and JMA issued the named Phanfone. Moving generally west-northwestward, Phanfone moved into the Philippine Area of Responsibility (PAR) at 5:00 am PHT December 23 and the Philippine weather bureau PAGASA locally named the system as Ursula. Owing to favorable conditions, Phanfone intensified further into a severe tropical storm hours later. By afternoon of December 24, Phanfone gained typhoon strength shortly before making its first three landfalls over Salcedo, Eastern Samar (4:45 pm PHT), Tacloban City (7:30 pm PHT), and Cabucgayan, Biliran (9:15 pm PHT). Further intensification ensued until December 25, with Phanfone peaking at 00:00 UTC with 150 km/h (93 mph) 10-minute sustained winds and a central pressure dropping to 970 hPa; the JTWC reported that Phanfone peaked at 175 km/h (109 mph) 1-minute sustained winds, equivalent to a Category 2 typhoon. Phanfone continued its west-northwestward track and, by afternoon of the same day, PAGASA had reported four additional landfalls: Gigantes Islands (2:30 am PHT), Ibajay, Aklan (8:40 am PHT), Semirara Island (1:00 pm PHT), and Bulalacao, Oriental Mindoro (3:00 pm PHT).

By December 26, Phanfone had already exited the Philippine landmass, moving northwest over the South China Sea. After holding strength for several hours, the system began losing strength due to unfavorable sea surface temperatures, medium wind shear and dry air intrusion. On December 27, Phanfone dropped to tropical storm status while rapidly deteriorating and slowly moving. On December 28, PAGASA issued its final warning as the system exited the PAR; later, JMA issued their final advisories as Phanfone weakened below warning threshold.

== Preparations and impact ==
=== Highest Tropical Cyclone Wind Signal ===
Highest Tropical Cyclone Wind Signal issued by PAGASA for Phanfone (Ursula) in each province.

TCWS#	Luzon	Visayas	Mindanao
3	Masbate, Ticao Island	Northern Samar, Samar, Eastern Samar, Biliran, Leyte, Extreme Northern Cebu, Camotes Island	None
2	Southern Portion of Quezon, Marinduque, Oriental Mindoro, Occidental Mindoro, Lubang Island, Romblon, Albay, Sorsogon, Burias Island, Calamian Island, Cuyo Island	Central Portion of Northern Cebu, Northeastern Iloilo, Northern Antique, Capiz, Aklan, Southern Leyte, Northern Negros Occidental	Dinagat Islands
1	Metro Manila, Bulacan, Bataan, Rizal, Cavite, Rest of Quezon, Laguna, Batangas, Camarines Sur, Camarines Norte, Catanduanes, Northern Palawan	Rest of Cebu, Bohol, Siquijor, Rest of Antique, Rest of Iloilo, Guimaras, Negros Oriental, Rest of Negros Occidental	Surigao del Norte, Siargao Islands, Bucas Grande Islands

=== Visayas ===
The PAGASA issued a signal 3 warning to Northern Samar, Samar, Eastern Samar, Leyte, Biliran and the Camotes Islands, meaning that 65–92 kn (75–106 mph; 120–170 km/h) winds were expected. The PAGASA also issued a signal 2 warning to the Visayas, meaning that 33–65 kn (38–75 mph; 61–120 km/h) winds were to be expected within 24 hours. It was issued to the central portion of northern Cebu, northeastern Iloilo, northern Antique, Capiz, Aklan, Southern Leyte, and Negros Occidental, which meant that Phanfone was taking a similar path to the areas hit by the much stronger Typhoon Haiyan. The Visayas was the worst hit, with Iloilo City having 13 casualties alone that had been either struck by fallen trees, electrocuted or drowned. Roxas, Tacloban and Maasin all received 140 mm (5.5 in) of rain. The extent of damage in the Philippines was quite far, with the Boracay Airport being heavily damaged as many people were stranded in the airport as the typhoon struck. A disaster response officer also reported that power outages and damage in the town of Batad in Iloilo Province made it appear as a “ghost town”. Severe flooding caused devastating damage in the many provinces and islands of Visayas as rain spread across the region, with many houses and vehicles being partially to completely submerged. Multiple houses were crumpled and trees were downed, as well as power lines being downed. All of these obstacles blocked off roads and made roads dangerous to walk on; and the excessive amounts of rainfall made ground, especially higher ground, very unstable. The province of Leyte was placed under a state of calamity following the damage of the typhoon, with livestock, crops and infrastructure being damaged in excess of $1 million USD. Most of the casualties are estimated to have taken place at Iloilo, as the village was badly hit with severe and swift-moving flash floods. Tacloban was hit as fires broke out and winds allowed them to spread but it the 220,000 inhabitants escaped the worst of the system. 147 cities were affected by power outages but by Friday, December 27, 31 of those 147 had their power restored.

Typhoon Phanfone making landfall

=== Eastern Samar ===
Because of the upcoming Christmas celebrations, 16,000 passengers who had holiday plans in their respective provinces with their families, were stranded in port for their safety due to the threat of the typhoon. Upon making landfall near Salcedo in Eastern Samar around 4:45 PM, it was reported that the typhoon was causing major flooding and mudslides in the region. As the storm quickly and unexpectedly intensified, over 58,000 people were evacuated in advance of the typhoon. Five fishermen were reported missing and a 70-year-old man died after his house was swept away and as a result, he drowned. Around 2,351 people have been affected by the typhoon and 1,654 were taking refuge in evacuation centers. The World Food Programme issued advisories and infographics plotting the projected path of Phanfone, as well as evacuation and relief centers. As of December 27, 2019, there are at least 28 confirmed fatalities according to the Philippines Disaster Agency, including a 13-year-old boy who was electrocuted.

=== Luzon ===
A signal 2 warning was also issued to Luzon, with the southern portion of Quezon, Marinduque, Oriental Mindoro, Occidental Mindoro including Lubang Island, Romblon, Albay, Sorsogon, Burias Island, Calamian and Cuyo Islands all forecast to be in the path of Phanfone. A signal 1 warning was issued to Bulacan, Bataan, Metro Manila, Rizal, rest of Quezon, Laguna, Batangas, Camarines Sur, Camarines Norte, Catanduanes and northern Palawan. The island's governor ordered local government units to conduct a forced evacuation plan, prompting civilians near flood-prone areas and areas with the potential to be affected by landslides, to relocate temporarily as a safety precaution. Local representatives visited residents in Libon, Maninila and Tandarora to advise them to evacuate and temporarily celebrate Christmas in evacuation centers for their safety. Many public schools were open in order to serve as shelters for residents while the provincial government distributed food packs to the evacuees. In Naval, the local government unit deployed evacuation tents for evacuees on Monday, December 23 with some tents reserved for senior citizens, pregnant women and people with disabilities. Personnel of the Romblon Provincial Mobile Force Company were deployed and conducted an inventory of Search and Rescue (SAR) equipment on December 23 in preparation for the typhoon. San Jose experienced 217 mm (8.5 in) of rain in just under 24 hours. Upwards of 58,000 people were evacuated from Luzon and its surrounding islands as the system brought torrential rain and severe flash flooding ensued as a result of the rains. One family was swept away whilst trying to reach higher ground. Water and power services were completely cut off, and restoration was estimated to take weeks.

== Retirement ==
Due to extensive damage done by Typhoon Phanfone in Visayas, PAGASA announced that the name Ursula was retired from the rotating lists and it will never be used again as a typhoon name within the Philippine Area of Responsibility (PAR); it was subsequently replaced with Ugong for the 2023 season. Likewise, the name Phanfone was retired during the 52nd annual session of the ESCAP/WMO Typhoon Committee in February 2020, and was eventually replaced by Nokaen in February 2021.

== See also ==
- Weather of 2019
- Tropical cyclones in 2019
- Cyclone Tracy (1974) – A cyclone that made landfall on Darwin, Northern Territory exactly on Christmas Day
- Typhoon Utor (2006) – A late-season typhoon that affected the same area and took the same path
- Typhoon Son-Tinh (2012) – Made landfall in some of the same areas as a tropical storm
- Typhoon Haiyan (2013) – An extremely powerful typhoon which devastated the same area six years before
- Typhoon Hagupit (2014) – Made landfall in the same area at a similar intensity
- Typhoon Nock-ten (2016) – Another typhoon that impacted the Philippines on Christmas Eve and Christmas Day
- Typhoon Kammuri (2019) – Struck a similar area only weeks before and took a similar track
- Typhoon Vongfong (2020) – A strong Category 3-equivalent typhoon impacted the Philippines after six months of inactivity in 2020
- Typhoon Rai (2021) – Another typhoon that impacted the Philippines one week before Christmas Eve
