= Tropical Storm Lingling (2014) =

Pacific tropical storm in 2014

Tropical Storm Lingling (Agaton)
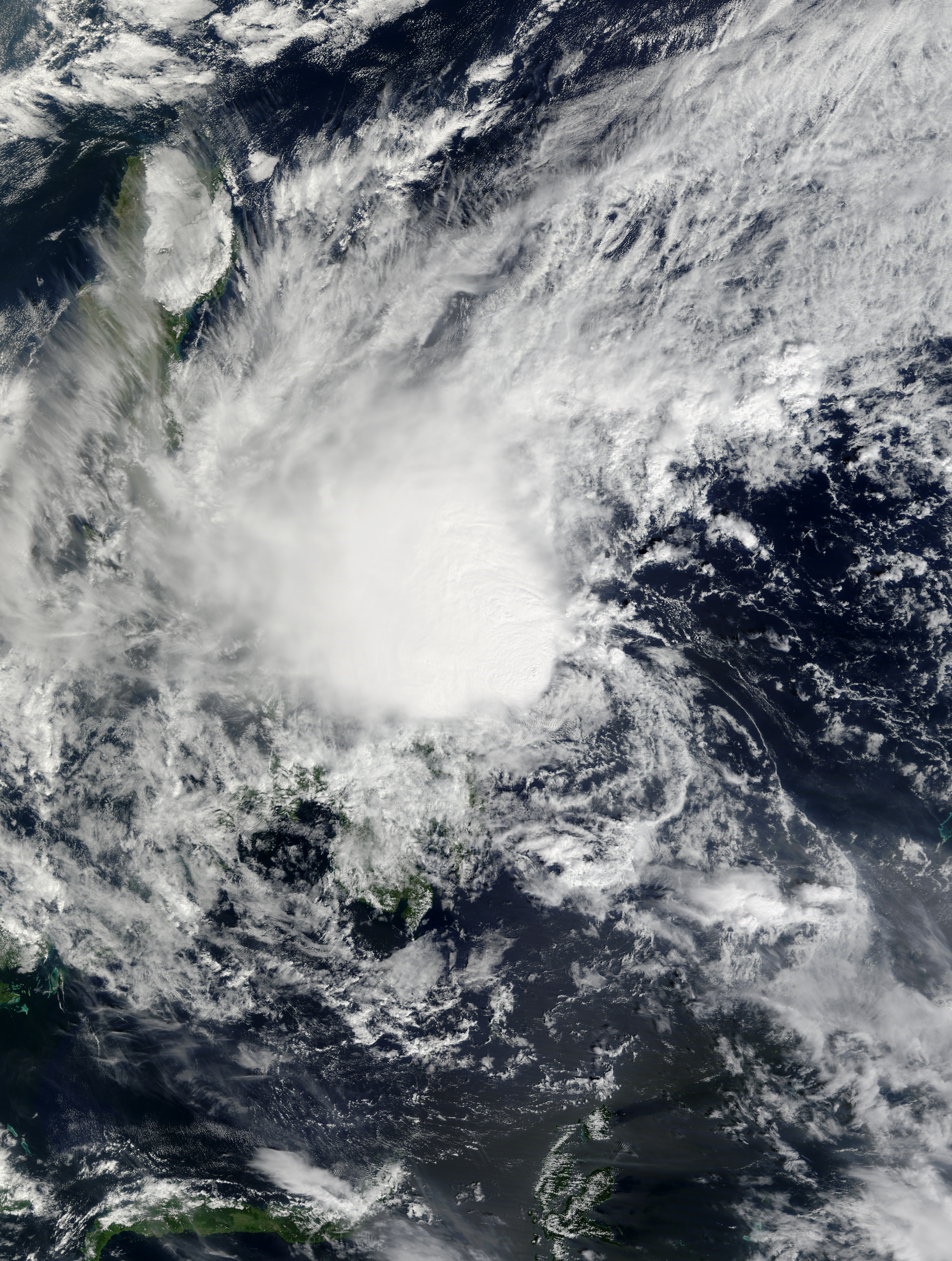
- Tropical Storm Lingling off Mindanao on January 18, 2014

Meteorological history
- Formed: January 10, 2014
- Dissipated: January 20, 2014

Tropical storm
- 10-minute sustained (JMA)
- Highest winds: 65 km/h (40 mph)
- Lowest pressure: 1002 hPa (mbar); 29.59 inHg

Tropical depression
- 1-minute sustained (SSHWS/JTWC)
- Highest winds: 55 km/h (35 mph)
- Lowest pressure: 1000 hPa (mbar); 29.53 inHg

Overall effects
- Fatalities: 70 total
- Damage: $12.6 million (2014 USD)
- Areas affected: Philippines
- IBTrACS
- Part of the 2014 Pacific typhoon season

Tropical Storm Lingling, known in the Philippines as Tropical Depression Agaton, (Note: Although most of the Asian meteorological agencies, including the Japan Meteorological Agency, recognized Lingling as a tropical storm, the Philippine Atmospheric, Geophysical and Astronomical Services Administration (PAGASA) only recognized Agaton as a tropical depression.) was a weak but deadly tropical cyclone that affected the Philippines in mid January 2014. The first named storm of the annual typhoon season, this early-season cyclone remained very disorganized throughout its lifespan. Lingling was the first major natural disaster in the Philippines after Typhoon Haiyan just two months earlier, as it caused widespread landslide incidents and floods in Mindanao, resulting in 70 deaths and damage amounting to over 566 million pesos on the island.

The predecessor of Lingling formed as a tropical depression southeast of Mindanao on January 10, yet it weakened into a low-pressure area on January 12. After crossing the island on January 13, the system redeveloped into a tropical depression off the northeast coast of Mindanao on January 15. After drifting generally westward and consolidating slowly, the depression intensified into Tropical Storm Lingling on January 18. Without further improvements, Lingling weakened into a tropical depression on January 20 because of its sheared structure and diminishing convection.

== Meteorological history ==
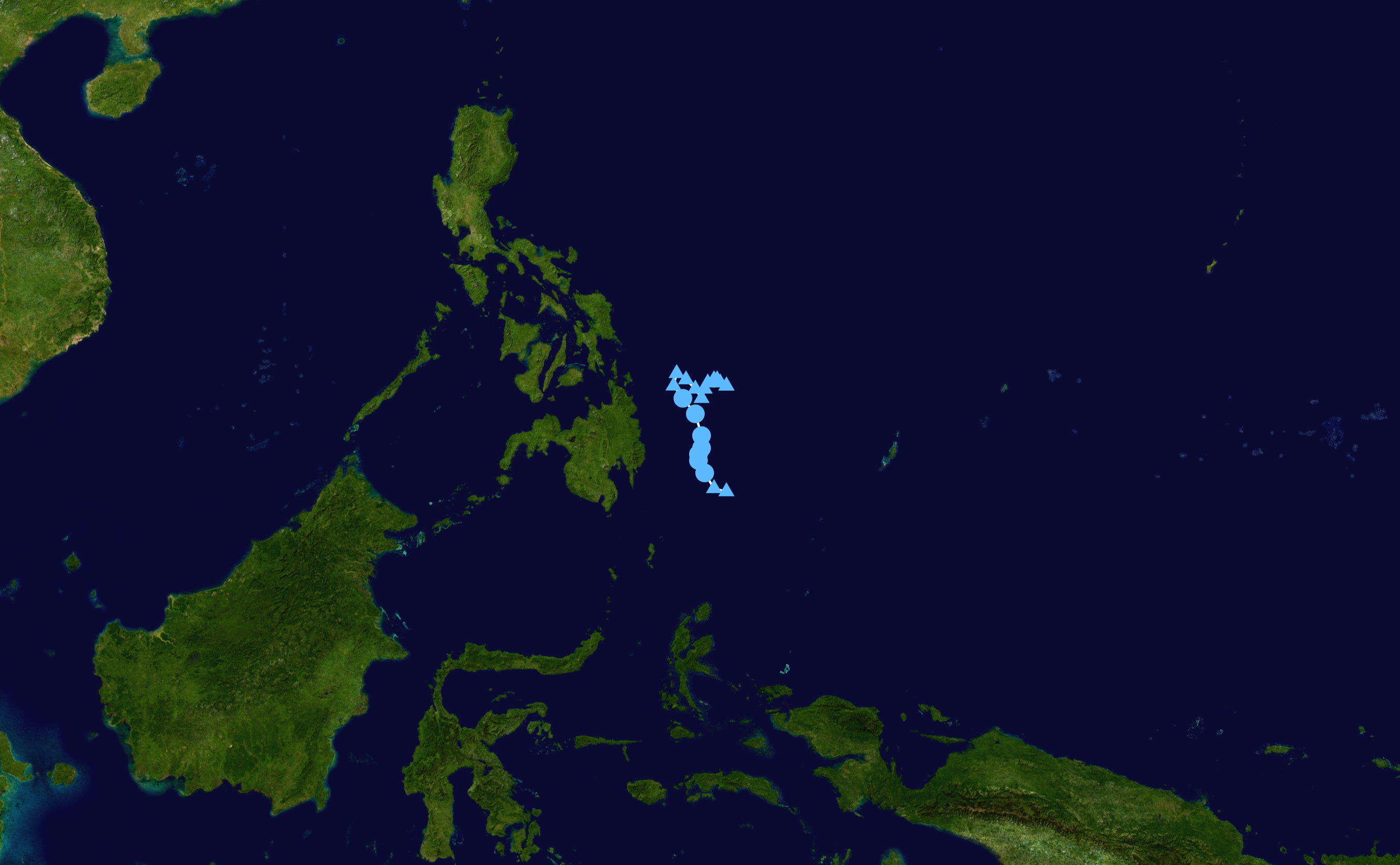
Map plotting the storm's track and intensity, according to the Saffir–Simpson scale Map key Saffir–Simpson scale Tropical depression (≤38 mph, ≤62 km/h) Tropical storm (39–73 mph, 63–118 km/h) Category 1 (74–95 mph, 119–153 km/h) Category 2 (96–110 mph, 154–177 km/h) Category 3 (111–129 mph, 178–208 km/h) Category 4 (130–156 mph, 209–251 km/h) Category 5 (≥157 mph, ≥252 km/h) Unknown Storm type Tropical cyclone Subtropical cyclone Extratropical cyclone, remnant low, tropical disturbance, or monsoon depression

On January 10, the JMA reported that a tropical depression had developed, about 1,800 km (1,120 mi) to the southeast of Manila, Philippines. The JMA expected the system to develop into a tropical storm within 24 hours, despite it being located in an area of marginal conditions for further development. Under moderate vertical wind shear, the system became highly sheared on the next day, although strong northeasterly trade wind surges and a good westward outflow enhanced by the strong easterly upper-level winds were helping to sustain the associated convection. On January 12, the JMA no longer expected a tropical storm and even downgraded the tropical depression to a low-pressure area late on the same day, when convection became more disorganized.

The low-pressure area crossed Mindanao, Philippines from the south on January 13 and emerged into the area off the northeast coast of Mindanao on the next day. Although the JMA operationally upgraded the system back to a tropical depression on January 14, the RSMC best track data indicated that the tropical depression had not persisted until 00:00 UTC on January 15, with the poor structure under high vertical wind shear and strong northeasterly surges. After the system slowly drifted west-northwestward and then southwestward, the JMA began to issue warnings on the tropical depression at noon on January 16, albeit not expecting it to intensify into a tropical storm. Soon, the Joint Typhoon Warning Center (JTWC) issued a Tropical Cyclone Formation Alert on the system, for the consolidating and slightly better defined low-level circulation center, favorable sea surface temperature, moderate vertical wind shear, as well as highly diffluent outflow.

Early on January 17, the Philippine Atmospheric, Geophysical and Astronomical Services Administration (PAGASA) upgraded the system from a low-pressure area to a tropical depression and assigned the local name Agaton, when the system was partially exposed with flaring deep convection along the northwestern quadrant. The JMA upgraded the tropical depression to a tropical storm about 210 km (130 mi) east of Surigao City and named it Lingling at 00:00 UTC on January 18, (Note: The name Lingling (Cantonese: 玲玲, [liŋ˨˩ liŋ˨˩]) was contributed by Hong Kong and is a feminine given nickname meaning "tinkling of a jade" in Cantonese.) shortly before the JTWC upgraded the system to a tropical depression. Lingling's central convection and the banding associated with a partially exposed low-level circulation center have become improved, when the storm started to drift southward away from a strong northeasterly surge in a weak steering environment. Six hours later, the JTWC upgraded Lingling to a tropical storm, based on the scatterometer data and Dvorak estimates.

However, half a day later, the JTWC downgraded Lingling to a tropical depression as its deep central convection was diminishing under the influence of moderate to strong vertical wind shear. Lingling began to accelerate south-southeastward under the influence of the strong northeasterly surge flow on January 19, and was struggling to consolidate due to the marginally favorable upper-level conditions. Late on the same day, the JTWC issued the final warning on Lingling, as the infrared satellite imageries depicted an exposed, weakening low-level circulation center with isolated, flaring convection sheared to the northwest. A ship observation at 15:00 UTC, 72 nautical miles (133 km; 83 mi) north-northeast of the system, reported winds at only 10 knots (20 km/h; 10 mph) with atmospheric pressure of 1,013 hPa (29.9 inHg).

During January 20, the JMA reported that the system weakened into a tropical depression, before the system was last noted later that day as it dissipated to the southeast of the Philippines.

== Impact ==
Despite not making landfall on the Philippines, the system brought considerable rainfall over several days to southern Mindanao that caused six flooding and sixteen landslide incidents. As a result, the majority of the 70 deaths caused by the system in the Philippines were caused by landslides or drowning. Other impacts caused by Lingling (Agaton) included damage to 3,482 houses and flooding to the irrigation dams in Cateel, Davao Oriental. Overall the total cost of damages was estimated at PHP567 million (US$12.6 million).

Several towns in Davao Oriental, including Baganga, Cateel and Boston, which were ravaged by Typhoon Bopha in 2012, were isolated after bridges had been washed out in the floods from Lingling. In Surigao City, the roads were littered with uprooted trees and metal roofing blown off houses. Although no deaths were reported in Eastern Samar, heavy rain and strong winds from Tropical Storm Lingling still affected the region which had been severely devastated by Typhoon Haiyan two months earlier. Hundreds of survivors of Haiyan were forced to flee after many emergency shelters were damaged by Lingling, and rice fields in several municipalities were also flooded by the storm.

== See also ==
- Weather of 2014
- Tropical cyclones in 2014
- Other tropical cyclones named Lingling
- Other tropical cyclones named Agaton
- Typhoon Bopha (2012)
- Typhoon Haiyan (2013)
- Tropical Storm Mekkhala (2015)
- Tropical Storm Megi (2022)
