= List of storms named Auring =

The name Auring has been used for 17 tropical cyclones in the Philippine Area of Responsibility in the West Pacific Ocean:

- Typhoon Polly (1963) (T6302, 09W, Auring) – a Category 1-equivalent typhoon that indundated over 36,000 homes in Japan
- Tropical Storm Ruby (1967) (T6701, 01W, Auring)
- Tropical Depression Auring (1971)
- Typhoon Lola (1975) (T7501, 01W, Auring) – a Category 1-equivalent typhoon that made landfall on Mindanao and caused 30 fatalities
- Typhoon Bess (1979) (T7902, 02W, Auring) – a Category 2-equivalent typhoon that became the third March typhoon in 20 years
- Typhoon Tip (1983) (T8302, 02W, Auring) – a Category 1-equivalent typhoon that made landfalls in the Philippines and China
- Typhoon Orchid (1987) (T8701, 01W, Auring) – a Category 2-equivalent typhoon that affected Ulithi
- Tropical Storm Sharon (1991) (T9101, 01W, Auring) – a severe tropical storm that affected the Philippines
- Tropical Storm Deanna (1995) (T9502, 03W, Auring) – unusually affected the west coast of Taiwan
- Tropical Storm Hilda (1999) (T9901, 01W, Auring) – caused heavy precipitation in Sabah
- Tropical Depression Auring (2001) (01W) – submerged over 100,000 homes in Leyte and on Mindanao
- Tropical Storm Roke (2005) (T0502, 02W, Auring) – a severe tropical storm that made landfall on Visayas
- Tropical Depression Auring (2009) – caused heavy precipitation in the Philippines
- Tropical Storm Sonamu (2013) (T1301, 01W, Auring) – a severe tropical storm that affected the Philippines and East Malaysia
- Tropical Depression Auring (2017) (01W) – caused heavy precipitation in the Philippines, causing 11 fatalities
- Tropical Storm Dujuan (2021) (T2101, 01W, Auring) – affected Palau and caused a fishing vessel with 15 fishermen to capsize in the Philippines
- Tropical Depression Auring (2025) – dropped precipitation across the Philippines, Taiwan, and China

Preceded by	Pacific typhoon season names Auring	Succeeded by Bising
