= Huaning =

Huaning may refer to:

- Huaning County, Yunnan, China
- Huaning Road, Shanghai, China

== See also ==
- Typhoon Huaning (disambiguation)
