= List of storms named Sisang =

Tropical cyclone name used in the Western Pacific

The name Sisang was used for seven tropical cyclones in the Philippine Area of Responsibility in the Western Pacific Ocean. All storms were named by PAGASA or its predecessor, the Philippine Weather Bureau:

- Tropical Storm Phyllis (1963) (T6322, 41W, Sisang) – a tropical storm which crossed the Philippines and was considered by the Joint Typhoon Warning Center (JTWC) as a low-end typhoon.
- Typhoon Nora (1967) (T6721, 24W, Sisang) – a minimal typhoon which affected the Ryukyu Islands, Taiwan and East China.
- Typhoon Nadine (1971) (T7118, 18W, Sisang) – a strong, Category 5-equivalent super typhoon that hit southern Taiwan and East China.
- Tropical Depression 24W (1975) (24W, Sisang) – a late-season tropical depression which skirted the central Philippines.
- Typhoon Sarah (1979) (T7919, 22W, Sisang-Uring) – an erratic typhoon that affected the Philippines and Vietnam.
- Tropical Storm Lex (1983) (T8316, 17W, Sisang) – a severe tropical storm considered by the JTWC as a Category 1 typhoon which claimed the lives of at least 200 fishermen in Vietnam.
- Typhoon Nina (1987) (T8722, 22W, Sisang) – a violent, Category 5-equivalent super typhoon which devastated southern Luzon, killing 979 people in the process.

Due to the widespread destruction caused by the 1987 storm, the name Sisang was retired after the 1987 season and replaced by Sendang.

== See also ==
Similar names that have been used for tropical cyclones:

- List of storms named Isang – used in the Western Pacific Ocean and in the South-West Indian Ocean.
- List of storms named Susang – also used in the Western Pacific Ocean.
