= List of storms named Isang =

The name Isang has been used for seventeen tropical cyclones worldwide: sixteen in the Western Pacific Ocean and in the South-West Indian Ocean. All of the Western Pacific typhoons were named by PAGASA or its predecessor, the Philippine Weather Bureau, and the South-West Indian Ocean cyclone was named by Météo-France.

In the Western Pacific:

- Typhoon Doris (1964) (T6407, 09W, Isang) – a minimal typhoon which threatened but ultimately did not affect land areas.
- Tropical Storm Winnie (1972) (T7212, 12W, Isang) – strong tropical storm which made landfall in eastern China.
- Typhoon Sally (1976) (T7608, 08W, Isang) – a Category 4-equivalent typhoon which stayed at sea.
- Tropical Depression Isang (1980) – short-lived tropical depression which made landfall in northern Luzon; only recognized by the Japan Meteorological Agency and PAGASA.
- Typhoon Holly (1984) (T8409, 10W, Isang) – a typhoon which affected southern Japan, the Korean Peninsula and the Soviet Union.
- Tropical Depression Isang (1988) – a weak system that was only tracked by PAGASA.
- Severe Tropical Storm Polly (1992) (T9216, 16W, Isang) – deadly tropical storm which severely affected China's Fujian and Zhejiang provinces, claiming 202 lives.
- Typhoon Kirk (1996) (T9612, 13W, Isang) – a strong typhoon which struck Japan, causing 4 deaths and moderate damage.
- Typhoon Bilis (2000) (T0010, 18W, Isang) – the strongest typhoon to form during the 2000 season; struck Taiwan and China, killing 71.

Preceded by Huaning	Pacific typhoon season names Isang	Succeeded by Lusing

- Typhoon Toraji (2001) (T0108, 11W, Isang) – destructive typhoon which killed at least 200 people in Taiwan and China.
- Typhoon Talim (2005) (T0513, 13W, Isang) – another strong typhoon that made landfall in Taiwan and eastern China, causing 157 fatalities.
- Typhoon Molave (2009) (T0906, 07W, Isang) – a decent typhoon that brushed the northern part of the Philippines before making landfall in China.
- Tropical Storm Cimaron (2013) (T1308, 08W, Isang) – a tropical storm that struck the Philippines and China, inflicting moderate damage.
- Typhoon Hato (2017) (T1713, 15W, Isang) – strongest typhoon to affect Macau and Hong Kong, causing at least $6 billion worth of damage.
- Tropical Storm Omais (2021) (T2112, 16W, Isang) – long-lived storm that affected the Ryukyu Islands and hit the Korean Peninsula as a remnant low.
- Typhoon Kajiki (2025) (T2513, 19W, Isang) – typhoon that affected the northern part of the Philippines and made landfall in Vietnam.

Preceded by Huaning	Pacific typhoon season names Isang	Succeeded by Jacinto

In the South-West Indian Ocean:

- Tropical Storm Isang (2005) – a severe tropical storm that did not affect land.

== See also ==
Similar names that have been used to name tropical cyclones:

- List of storms named Esang – also used in the Western Pacific Ocean.
- List of storms named Isa – used in the Western Pacific Ocean and the Australian region.
- List of storms named Ising – also used in the Western Pacific Ocean.
- List of storms named Osang – also used in the Western Pacific Ocean.
- List of storms named Sisang – also used in the Western Pacific Ocean.
