= Typhoon Talim (2005) =

Pacific typhoon in 2005

Typhoon Talim (Isang)
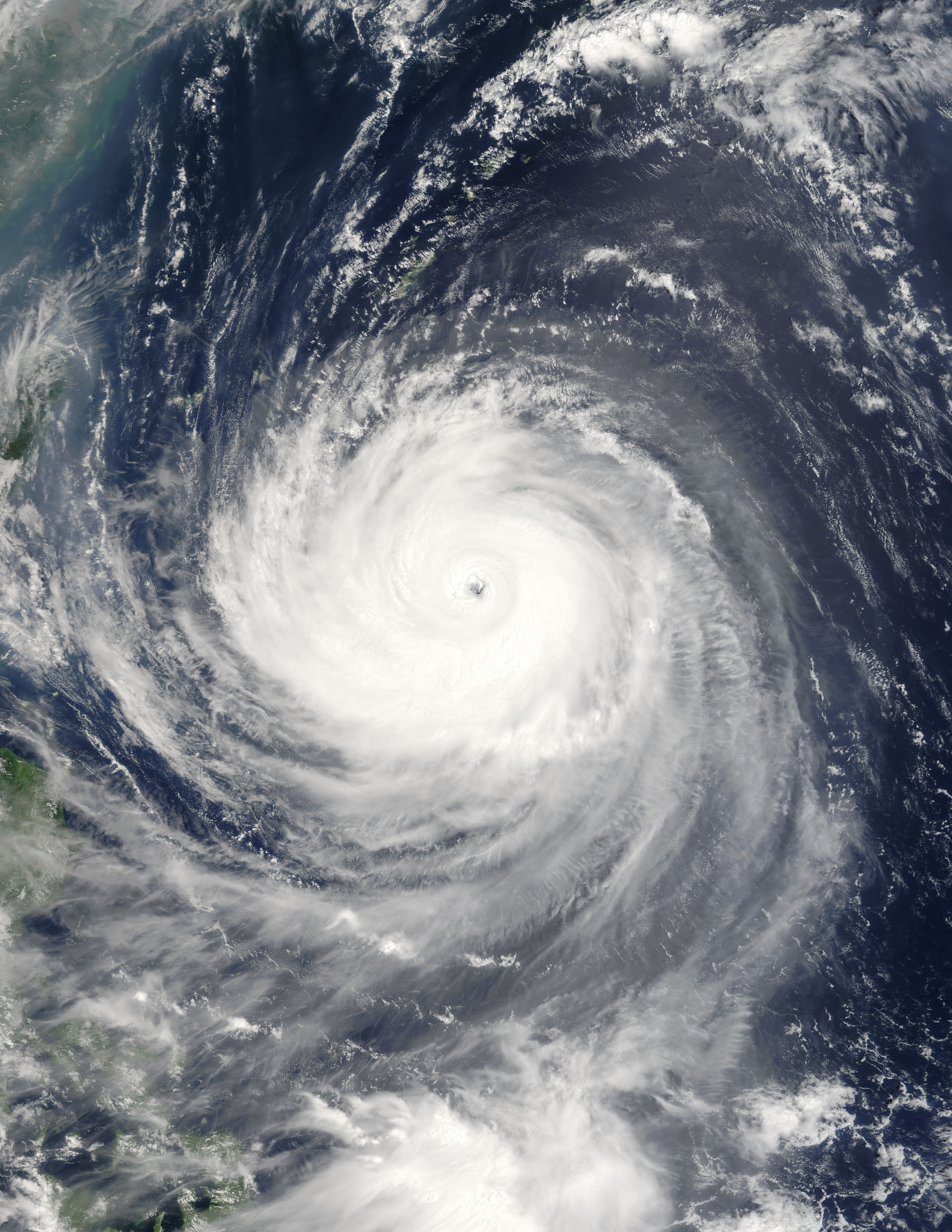
- Typhoon Talim at peak intensity on August 30

Meteorological history
- Formed: August 24, 2005
- Dissipated: September 1, 2005

Very strong typhoon
- 10-minute sustained (JMA)
- Highest winds: 175 km/h (110 mph)
- Lowest pressure: 925 hPa (mbar); 27.32 inHg

Category 4-equivalent super typhoon
- 1-minute sustained (SSHWS/JTWC)
- Highest winds: 240 km/h (150 mph)
- Lowest pressure: 910 hPa (mbar); 26.87 inHg

Overall effects
- Fatalities: 172 total
- Damage: $1.59 billion (2005 USD)
- Areas affected: Taiwan, China
- IBTrACS
- Part of the 2005 Pacific typhoon season

Typhoon Talim, (Note: The name Talim (Tagalog: talim, [tɐˈlɪm]) was contributed by the Philippines and means "sharp and piercing edge of a blade, cutting point" in Tagalog.) known in the Philippines as Super Typhoon Isang, was a strong tropical cyclone that passed over Taiwan on the night of August 31 to September 1, 2005, and over Southeast China on September 2. At peak intensity, Talim was a Category 4 super typhoon. There were 172 deaths.

== Meteorological history ==
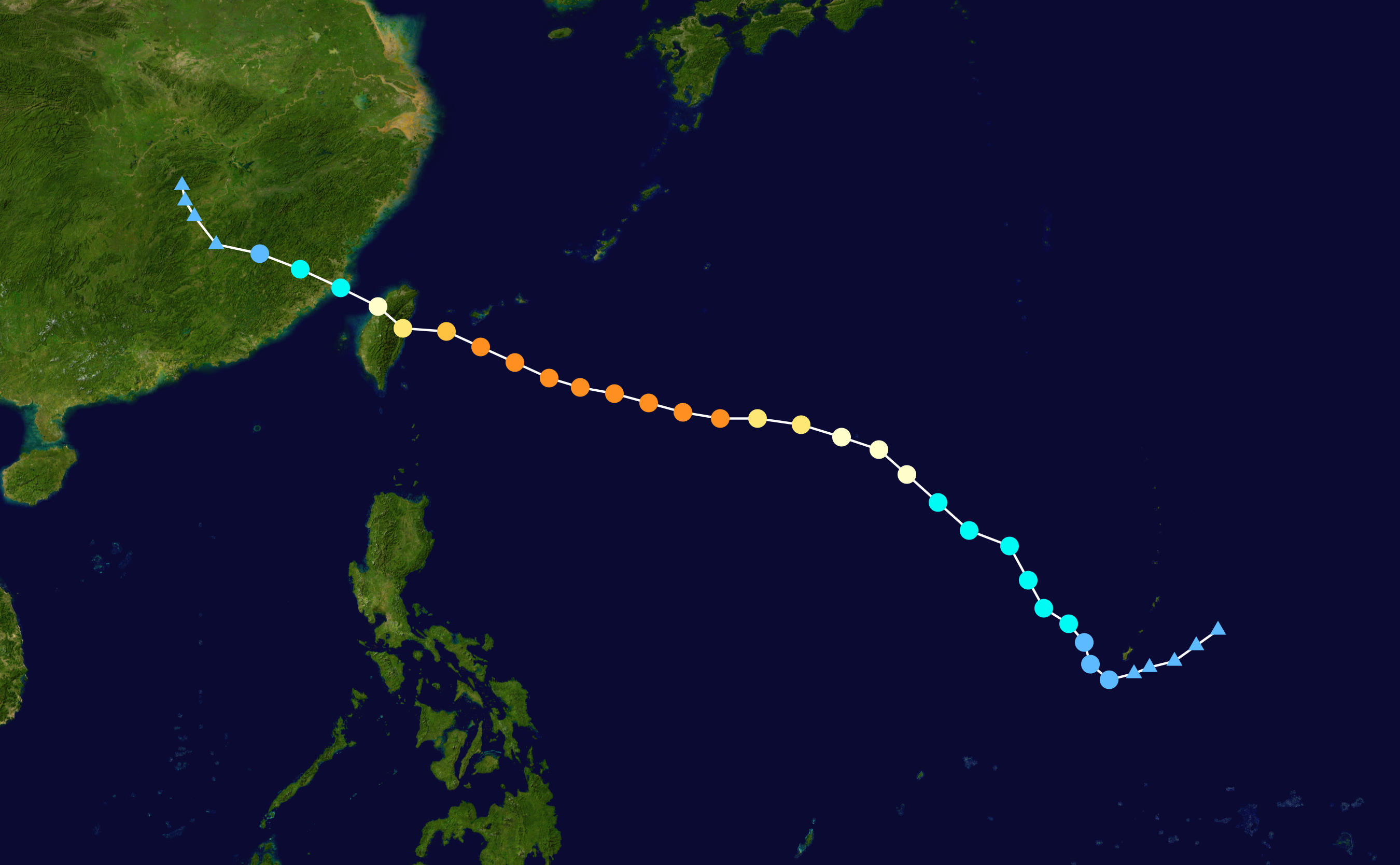
Map plotting the storm's track and intensity, according to the Saffir–Simpson scale Map key Saffir–Simpson scale Tropical depression (≤38 mph, ≤62 km/h) Tropical storm (39–73 mph, 63–118 km/h) Category 1 (74–95 mph, 119–153 km/h) Category 2 (96–110 mph, 154–177 km/h) Category 3 (111–129 mph, 178–208 km/h) Category 4 (130–156 mph, 209–251 km/h) Category 5 (≥157 mph, ≥252 km/h) Unknown Storm type Tropical cyclone Subtropical cyclone Extratropical cyclone, remnant low, tropical disturbance, or monsoon depression

An area of convection which developed and persisted approximately 250 nmi east-northeast of Guam. It was first mentioned as a suspect area in JTWC's STWO issued at 06:00 UTC 24 August when satellite imagery revealed a broad LLCC associated with the disturbance. An upper-level analysis revealed a low to moderate wind shear environment. However, an upper-level low was impinging on the outflow on the northern side of the circulation. Despite this, the potential for development of a significant tropical cyclone was raised to "good" at August 25 22:00 UTC and a TCFA issued. The first warning was released at 26/0600 UTC when Tropical Depression 13W was located approximately 100 nmi west-southwest of Guam. It was upgraded to a 35-kn tropical storm by both JTWC and JMA on August 27 00:00 UTC, the tropical cyclone being assigned the name Talim.

Tropical Storm Talim steadily intensified on 27 August as it moved on a general northwestward track along the southwestern periphery of a sub-tropical ridge. The tropical cyclone was raised to typhoon intensity at 0600 UTC 28 August when it was located approximately 690 nmi south-east of Okinawa. At this time, PAGASA christened the tropical cyclone: Isang after the storm had entered their AOR. Typhoon Talim continued to strengthen on 28 August while moving on a more westward heading and reached a peak intensity of 130 kn on August 29 18:00 UTC. After maintaining this strength for nearly 24 hours, a weakening trend began late on 30 August as the storm approached the island of Taiwan. Typhoon Talim made landfall near Hualien, Taiwan, on August 31 18:00 UTC with a MSW of 95 kn. From there, the cyclone crossed the Taiwan Strait and came ashore near Fuzhou, China, around September 1 06:00 UTC, the same time that it was downgraded to a 55-kn tropical storm. JTWC issued the final warning on the same day while JMA continued to maintain the system as a tropical storm, downgrading Talim to a tropical depression at September 2 06:00 UTC. The last statement issued by JMA was later that day.

== Impact ==
=== Taiwan ===
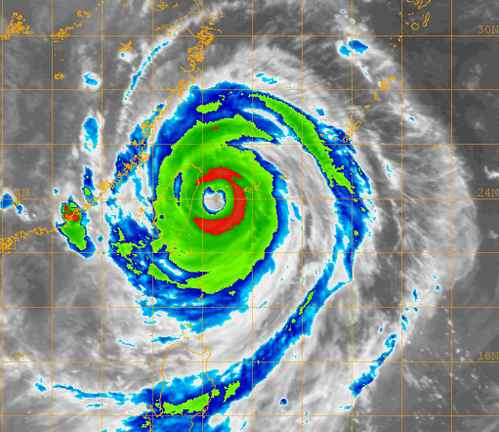
Satellite cloud picture of Typhoon Talim nearing landfall on August 31

There were five deaths in Taiwan. Damage totaled NT$2.9 billion ($92.37 million). Typhoon Talim was the second storm of such strength to hit Taiwan during the 2005 storm season, the first time since 1994.

=== Mainland China ===
There were 167 deaths across mainland China due to Typhoon Talim. More than 15 million people were affected by the storm. At least 110 people were reported dead in eastern China, mainly because of floods and landslides. A further 28 people were reported missing. More than 150,000 people were evacuated, and thousands of homes were damaged or destroyed. The Ministry of Civil Affairs in China reported that the typhoon caused 12.19 billion yuan (about US$1.5 billion) of economic losses.

=== Philippines ===
In the Philippines, no one was reported hurt, missing, or dead, but heavy rains were experienced as Talim lashed through the island of Luzon.

== See also ==
- Other tropical cyclones named Talim
- Other tropical cyclones named Isang
