= Tropical Storm Lupit (2021) =

Pacific tropical storm in 2021

Tropical Storm Lupit (Huaning)
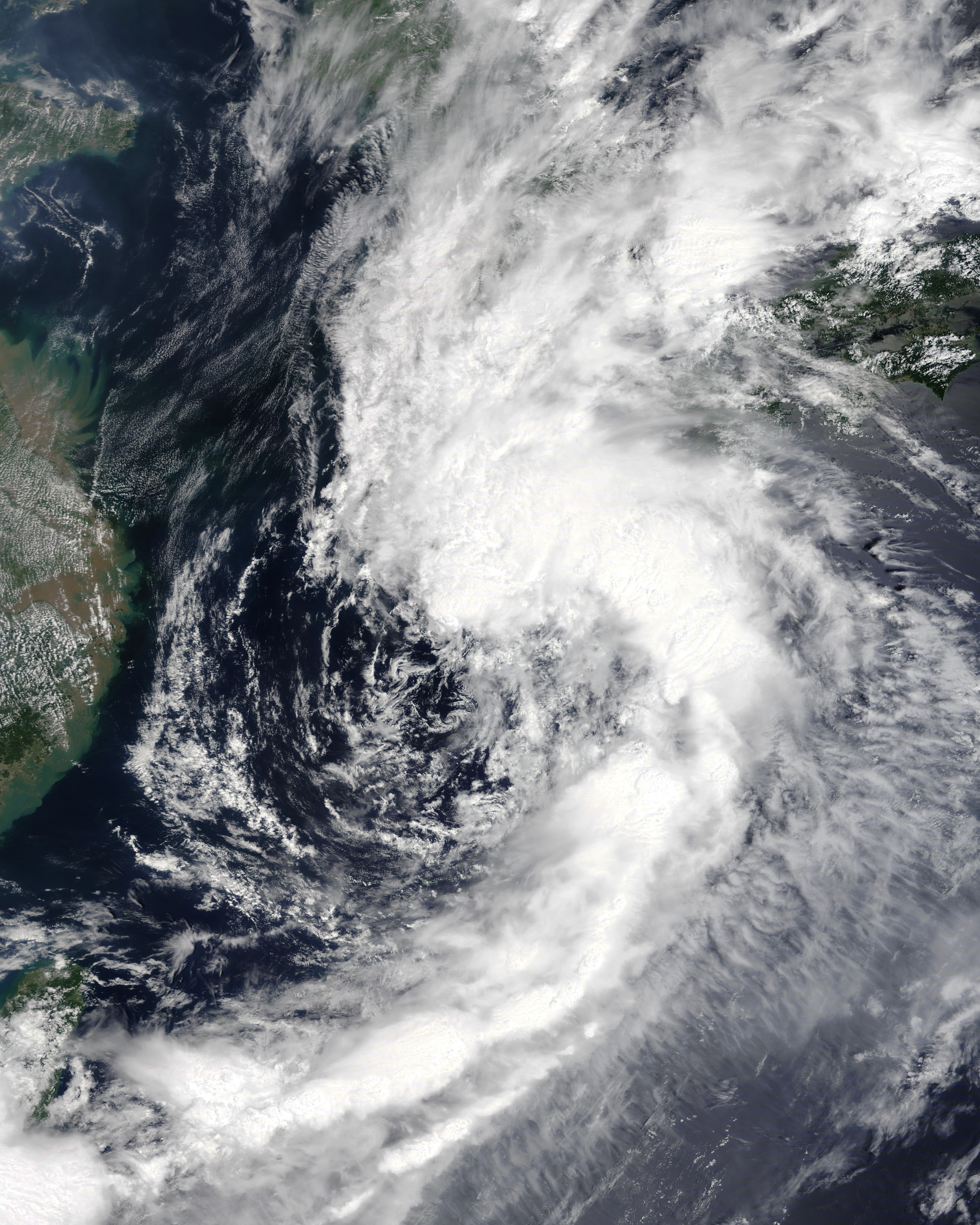
- Tropical Storm Lupit near peak intensity on August 8

Meteorological history
- Formed: August 2, 2021
- Extratropical: August 9, 2021
- Dissipated: August 16, 2021

Tropical storm
- 10-minute sustained (JMA)
- Highest winds: 85 km/h (50 mph)
- Lowest pressure: 984 hPa (mbar); 29.06 inHg

Tropical storm
- 1-minute sustained (SSHWS/JTWC)
- Highest winds: 85 km/h (50 mph)
- Lowest pressure: 976 hPa (mbar); 28.82 inHg

Overall effects
- Fatalities: 6
- Missing: 1
- Damage: $217 million (2021 USD)
- Areas affected: Northern Vietnam, South China, East China (especially Fujian), Taiwan, Ryukyu Islands, Japan
- IBTrACS
- Part of the 2021 Pacific typhoon season

Tropical Storm Lupit, (Note: The name Lupit (Tagalog: lupit, [lʊˈpɪt̚]) was contributed by the Philippines and means "cruelty, brutality" in Tagalog.) known in the Philippines as Tropical Storm Huaning, was a tropical cyclone that affected Hong Kong and Macau, while also impacting the Guangdong and Fujian provinces in mainland China, Taiwan and Japan in early-August 2021. The ninth named storm of the 2021 Pacific typhoon season, the system was first tracked as a tropical depression by the Japan Meteorological Agency (JMA) as a tropical depression over Zhanjiang. It then moved east-northeastward, affecting Hong Kong and Macau before strengthening to a tropical storm, whereas it was named Lupit. On August 5, as it neared the coast of Guangdong Province, it slightly intensified before the storm made two consecutive landfalls over Nan'ao County in Guangdong and Dongshan County in Fujian on that day. It then turned towards Taiwan before striking the northern part of the island. After lashing the area with torrential rainfall that led to numerous landslides and unknown damages, it approached and made two consecutive landfalls at mainland Japan before entering the Sea of Japan, in where it became extratropical.

Many people in the affected area of Lupit immediately evacuated due to the possible hazards from the storm. 6 deaths were confirmed from Lupit: four in Taiwan and the other in Japan. Another was missing in the former. Damages were calculated at $217.1 million (2021 USD).

== Meteorological history ==
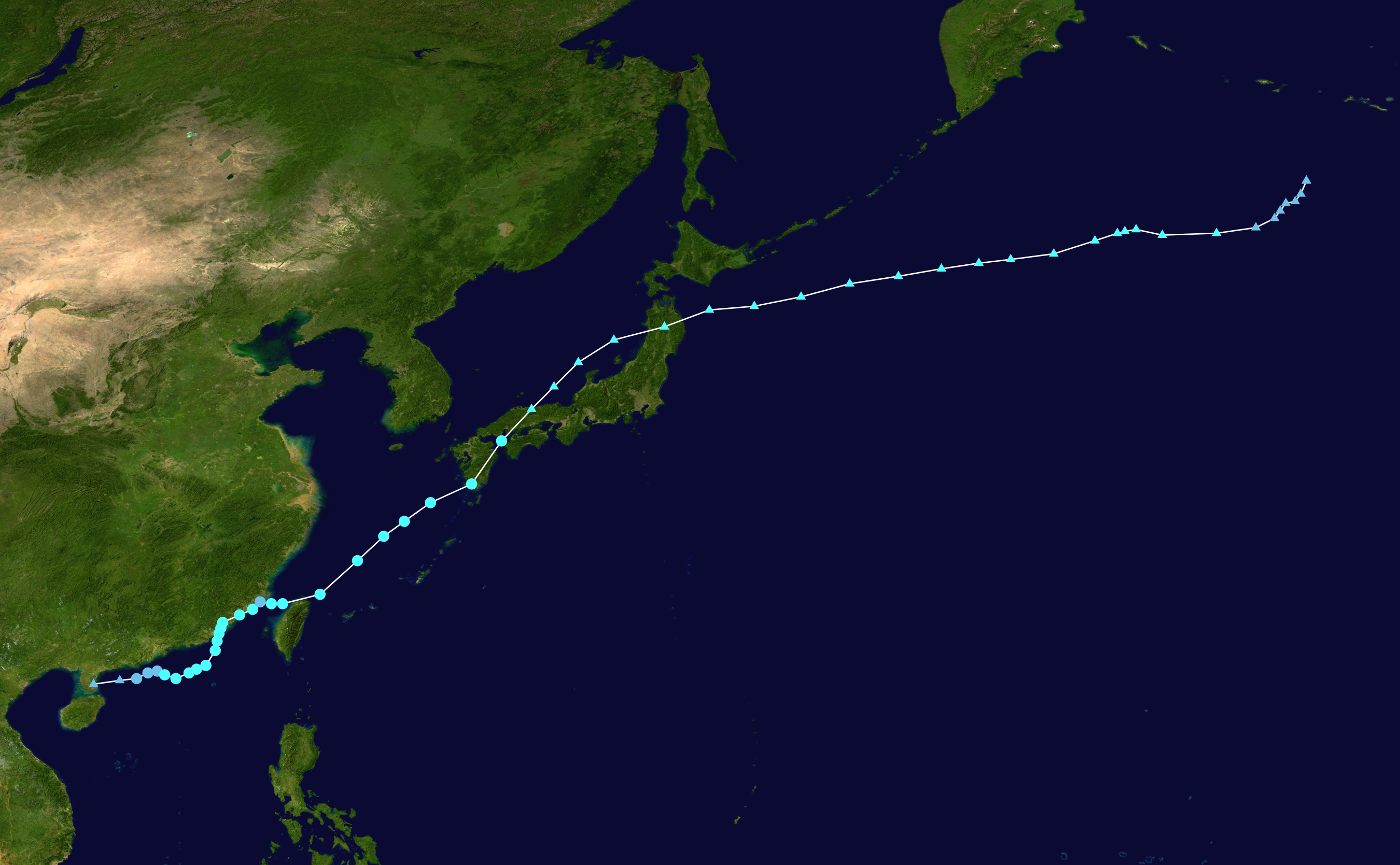
Map plotting the storm's track and intensity, according to the Saffir–Simpson scale Map key Saffir–Simpson scale Tropical depression (≤38 mph, ≤62 km/h) Tropical storm (39–73 mph, 63–118 km/h) Category 1 (74–95 mph, 119–153 km/h) Category 2 (96–110 mph, 154–177 km/h) Category 3 (111–129 mph, 178–208 km/h) Category 4 (130–156 mph, 209–251 km/h) Category 5 (≥157 mph, ≥252 km/h) Unknown Storm type Tropical cyclone Subtropical cyclone Extratropical cyclone, remnant low, tropical disturbance, or monsoon depression

On 06:00 UTC of August 2, the Japan Meteorological Agency (JMA) started to monitor an east-moving tropical depression over Leizhou, Zhanjiang. (Note: The Japan Meteorological Agency is the official Regional Specialized Meteorological Center for the western Pacific Ocean.) On the next few hours, it moved into the South China Sea where conditions were conducive for tropical cyclogenesis, with warm 29–30 °C (84–86 °F) sea surface temperatures, low vertical wind shear and equatorial outflow providing on the system. The consolidation of the system's still developing low level circulation center (LLCC), its flaring convection to the southeast and the aforementioned environment prompted the Joint Typhoon Warning Center (JTWC) (Note: The Joint Typhoon Warning Center is a joint United States Navy – United States Air Force task force that issues tropical cyclone warnings for the western Pacific Ocean and other regions.) to issue a Tropical Cyclone Formation Alert on the storm at 13:00 UTC that day. Development further continued as it traversed eastward and eight hours later, the JTWC upgraded the system to a tropical depression, being assigned the identifier 13W as it further became compact whilst its LLCC became slightly exposed due to shear.

Despite the remaining wind shear impacting the system, a near-equatorial ridge to the south guided the depression to a more favorable environment that signified 13W's intensification. As it shifted east-northeast, the system slightly improved during the early hours of August 3, although the depression slowly interacted with the landmass of Macau and Hong Kong, which caused it to slightly degrade. On 21:00 UTC that day, the JTWC reported that 13W further intensified to a tropical storm as infrared satellite imagery revealed convective banding on the northern side of the system's circulation; the JMA did the same on the next day, naming the system as Lupit. As the system slowed down by that day, it remained its convective signature as marginal conditions buoyed the system to slowly strengthen while moving north-northwestward, at that time. Its inner core also became well-defined on satellite imagery, being separated from large spiral banding to the northeast. Continuous wind shear resulted in Lupit becoming asymmetric by the early hours of August 5. As it neared the coast of Shantou, its circulation became distinct; however, its convection remained strongest on the south side due to wind shear. At 03:20 UTC (11:20 CST), Lupit made landfall over Nan'ao County, Shantou before tracking northeastward inland and weakening slightly to 75 km/h (45 mph) from its initial intensity of 85 km/h (50 mph) upon moving inland due to land interaction. It followed another landfall at Dongshan County, Fujian at 08:50 UTC (04:50 CST) that day as Lupit's structure rapidly degraded with weakening convection and core structure. Early the next day, it moved over Xiamen Island while moving northeastward and further, exited into the Taiwan Strait as it shifted to the east-northeastward from Quanzhou's east. In addition, its structure slowly became organized as it moved over the marginal warm waters of the area.

Lupit neared the northern coast of Taiwan as a weak tropical storm, with a broad circulation center being located in radar imagery and its convection strengthening as a result of still-favorable environmental conditions. By 21:00 UTC that day (05:00 PHT of the next day), the system entered the Philippine Area of Responsibility, being provided the local name Huaning by the PAGASA. Huaning then quickly exited the PAR at 03:00 UTC (11:00 PHT) on August 7 before following another landfall between Taoyuan and Hsinchu on that morning, being the first tropical cyclone to do so in that area since reliable records began and the third to reach the western north of the country, as Nakri of 2002 did in Miaoli-Taichung and Talim in 2012, nearly on Miaoli. It also became the first ever tropical cyclone to make landfall in Taiwan after making landfall in mainland China. Lupit then remained a tropical storm as it rapidly moved towards the country's landmass before it exited into the East China Sea. It moved to the east-northeast and northeast, with its overall structure becoming disorganized before slightly organizing, yet its circulation center still remained partly exposed. An upper-level shortwave trough started to move towards the Yellow Sea on that day, inducing wind shear on the broad and asymmetric system, which started to struggle with a pocket of dry air to the west. After 11:00 UTC on August 8 (20:00 JST), the JMA reported that Lupit made its first Japanese landfall near Makurazaki, Kagoshima as the system unraveled again due to land friction. It then followed by Lupit's 2nd and final landfall near Kure, Hiroshima after 20:00 UTC (05:00 JST) that day before emerging in the Sea of Japan on August 9 as a disorganized system.

The JMA downgraded the storm to an extratropical low over Okayama by early the next day. A warm Sea of Japan helped to maintain the system's intensity as a tropical storm; however, increasing wind shear from an upper-level trough continued to impact Lupit, causing its overall structure to decay. By the night of that day, the JTWC issued its final warning on the storm, as they noted that the system started to undergo extratropical transition while entering the baroclinic zone.

== Preparations and impact ==
=== China ===
The Hong Kong Observatory and Macao Meteorological and Geophysical Bureau issued tropical cyclone warnings for their respective territories on August 4 due to the threat of strong winds and heavy rainfall. Showers and thunderstorms were forecasted by the former due to the storm. Hong Kong and Macau's education bureau also cancelled classes for the kindergartens and schools for children with different disabilities on August 3. 20 mm (0.79 in)-30 mm (1.2 in) of rainfall were reported on that day, while rough waves impacted the territory's shores. An old man was injured on August 2 when a branch from a tree which is 15-meter tall fell on him. As the aforementioned rainfall amounts reached 30 mm (1.2 in), the HKO issued an amber rainstorm signal, which was cancelled altogether with the typhoon signals on 10:20 UTC of August 4 (6:20 CST).

A blue warning was issued for mainland China on August 3 due to Lupit. Meanwhile, over 33,000 people in Guangdong were evacuated to safe places while over 3,000 fishing boats and vessels were sheltered and returned to ports. 25,000 individuals from nearby Fujian were forced to leave their homes as the storm neared the province, while 153 boats were called for shelter and 218 scenic spots and ports were closed. People in the area whose evacuated rapidly increased to 89,590 on August 7. A reservoir in Luohu District, Shenzhen reported a rain accumulation of 109.6 mm (4.31 in) on August 5, while flooding reached until the chest of individuals on the area and cars being submerged, from numerous pictures showed on Weibo that day. The only fatality from China was the party branch secretary of a village in Xiapu County, being identified as Sun Limei, which she fell into a body of water while cleaning a silt on August 6. Her body was then recovered on that night.

=== Taiwan ===
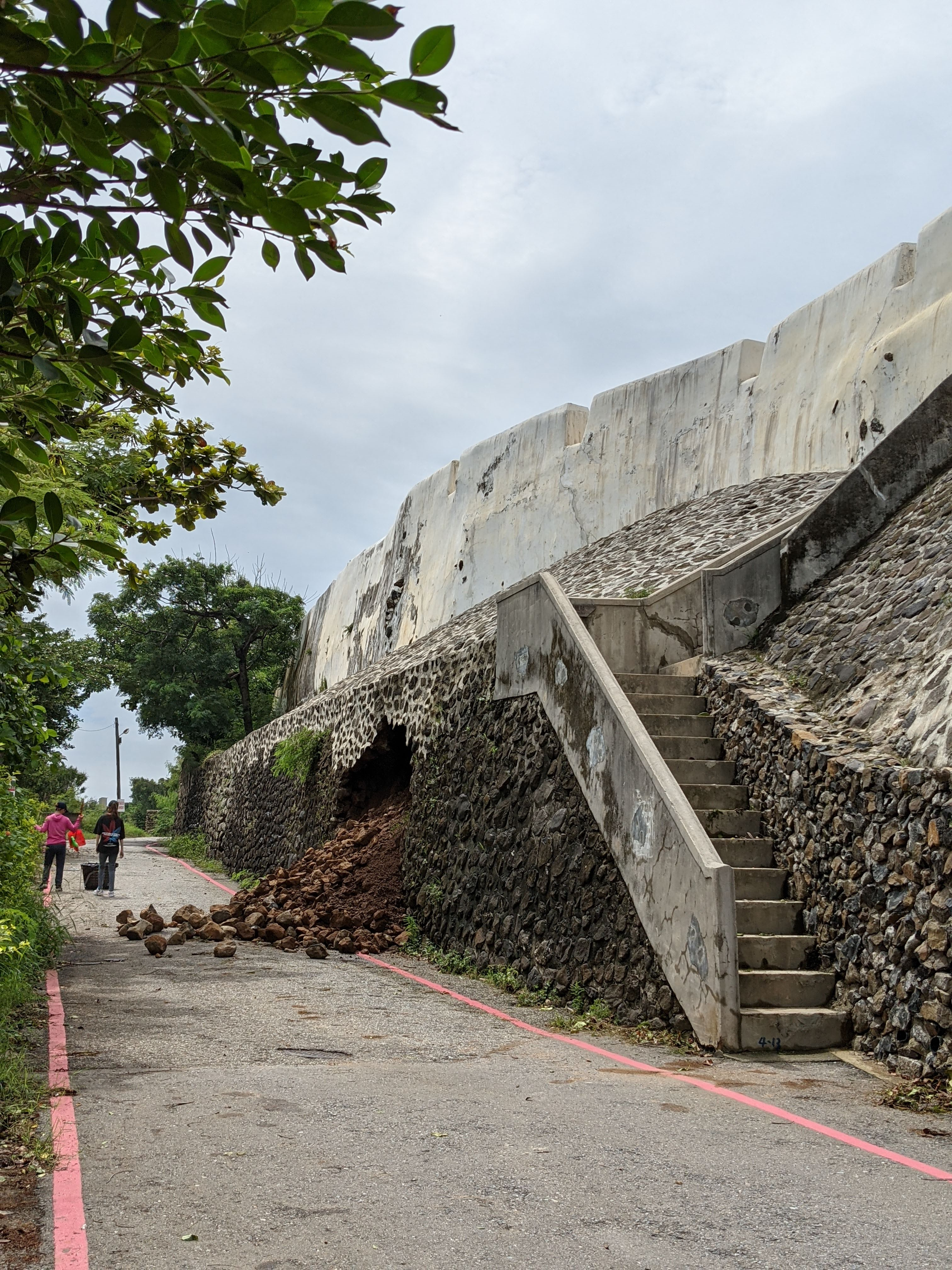
The view of Magong City Wall after Tropical Storm Lupit on August 7

As a precaution, all classes in Yunlin County were halted starting on August 7 due to Lupit. Rockfall alerts were issued by the Council of Agriculture on 7 townships and 23 villages in the country as the storm approached. Its army were also on standby for different emergencies. Many people from different townships were evacuated as a result of heavy rains. Domestic, international flights and sea transportations were also canceled.

Kaohsiung, Chiayi County and the Nantou Mountains all exceeded a rainfall amount of 400.0 mm (15.75 in) on August 7 while the Hengchun Peninsula was at 800.0 mm (31.50 in) the next day. Wutai Township in Pingtung County, meanwhile, measured 535.0 mm (21.06 in) from the storm that day while Liugui Xinfa Community got 1,301.0 mm (51.22 in) from August 6–9. Many reservoirs released their waters due to the rainfall, while flood warnings were also issued on that day. On August 8, Kaohsiung's Mingba Kelu Bridge collapsed as a result of heavy rains, trapping 501 individuals in 3 tribes from an isolated island in Taoyuan District. They were subsequently rescued by authorities that day by a helicopter. Trees were also uprooted in the area due to strong winds. In addition, some areas in the city were flooded as a result of the downpour, which started on August 5. Namashya District, Taoyuan District and Maolin District were ordered to be closed tomorrow due to the storm while many districts in Taiwan canceled classes as heavy rains continued to pound the area. Landslides also impacted the Guanming Tunnel in Nantou County, which disrupted traffic. The Miaoli Station of Taiwan High Speed Rail was closed to the public due to the risk of landslides while a container ship sank on Budai Harbor as a result of rough waves; however, no one was killed as they were immediately rescued. Many reservoirs also discharged their waters due to continuous rains. A woman was reported to be injured when her car fell into a sinkhole on August 11 due to the heavy rains from Lupit in Taichung, although the system already moved away from the country at that time. Different pictures by the country's government showed crops and houses being submerged in floodwaters, soils being washed away by rivers, rough waves impacting the shores of Kaohsiung and roads being destroyed by continuous rains.

Four were reported dead and one were missing due to Lupit in Taiwan; two drowned in Ren'ai, Nantou, when they were washed away by a stream on August 6, one when a teenager fell into the Zengwen Reservoir on August 11 while getting a phone that he dropped on the area; his body were recovered on the next day by the authorities. A man whose jogging in Anping Harbor was killed as he was smashed by a large wave into a seawall in the said area on August 7, while his two friends were injured. Meanwhile, an indigenous female representative in Kaohsiung was reported to be swept away by a rising river; however, search operations were continuously halted by the poor conditions in the area. Agricultural damages from the storm totaled NT$420 million ($15.1 million).

=== Japan ===
125,904 households and 250,055 individuals were instructed to evacuate due to Lupit, particularly in the prefectures of Ehime, Fukuoka, Oita, Miyazaki and Kagoshima. Heavy rains and strong winds were also forecasted from the storm. 125 domestic flights from Kyushu were cancelled.

Katsuura, Chiba, reported its highest rainfall amount for the month of August, standing at 255.5 mm (10.06 in) on an eight-hour period on August 8. 61,000 individuals in Shimane Prefecture, including the Oki Islands lost power due to Lupit, while roads, trees, railways and approximately 80 houses in the area suffered damages. Heavy rains and strong winds impacted the Ishikawa Prefecture, with a rain accumulation of 219.5 mm (8.64 in) recorded in Kaga Sugaya. Many transportation services were halted in the area, while roadways were closed. Four houses in the prefecture were damaged, according to the government there. Yayoi Kusama's "yellow pumpkin" was washed away and damaged by strong waves in the Seto Inland Sea on August 9. A power outage in Mima, Tokushima, disrupted the storage life of coronavirus vaccines, also causing canceled vaccination schedules. Crops before harvest, including tomatoes were also soaked by heavy rains in Fukuoka and Saga prefectures, especially Munakata in the former.

Cape Erimo reported winds at 40 m/s (140 km/h; 89 mph) from the remnant extratropical cyclone of Lupit. It caused destruction in Aomori Prefecture, where landslides impacted National Route 279 in Mutsu and Kazamaura. A bridge was destroyed in the former forcing the full closure of the highway, isolating about 700 people. 225 more were given evacuation warnings by authorities in the prefecture on August 10. No deaths and injuries were reported, while the damages were tallied as of August 11. Over 100 peaches, in the other hand, fell in the height of strong winds in Niigata City. In Muroran, a city in a subprefecture in Hokkaido, a rain accumulation of 79.0 mm (3.11 in) were reported on August 10, the highest in the area's history. 305.5 mm (12.03 in) of rain was also reported from the extratropical remnants of Lupit on Toi Tomari, Hakodate. These amounts forced the opening of shelters for evacuees. The JR Hokkaido also suspended 68 train services in the area due to the forecasted imminent weather from the storm. Many mountaineers in Hadokate also required rescues due to the weather on August 10, while 1204 people from 669 residences were evacuated that day. Despite the rains being a catastrophe for some, farmers in Akita Prefecture considered these as "blessings" as it helped some croplands in the area to be watered.

Two people—one in Okayama Prefecture and another in Shimane Prefecture—were reported dead due to the storm. Damages in Aomori were tallied to be at ¥500 million (US$5.28 million), while damage in Shimane totaled ¥21.6 billion ($196.7 million) from prolonged rains from Lupit and downpours that started on August 12. The Japan National High-school Baseball Championship, was postponed due to Lupit on August 9.

== See also ==
- Weather of 2021
- Tropical cyclones in 2021
- Other tropical cyclones named Lupit
- Other tropical cyclones named Huaning
- Tropical Storm Hagibis (2014)
