= List of storms named Ising =

The name Ising has been used for ten tropical cyclones in the West Pacific Ocean, in all cases being named by PAGASA:

- Typhoon Agnes (1963) (T6308, 18W, Ising) – made landfall in northern Luzon in the Philippines as a Category 2-equivalent typhoon before entering the South China Sea, where it made a second landfall in China.
- Typhoon Clara (1967) (T6708, 08W, Ising)
- Tropical Storm Emma (1971) (T7109, 09W, Ising)
- Typhoon Betty (1975) (T7512, 14W, Ising) – struck Taiwan and China.
- Typhoon Hope (1979) (09W, Ising, 3B) – a Category 4-equivalent super typhoon that brushed Taiwan and then struck southern China; subsequently crossed into the North Indian Ocean and restrengthened to a severe cyclonic storm.
- Typhoon Forrest (1983) (T8310, 11W, Ising) – a deadly and destructive Category 5-equivalent super typhoon that hit Japan.
- Typhoon Cary (1987) (T8711, 10W, Ising) – made landfall in Luzon, Philippines, and later in northern Vietnam.
- Typhoon Caitlin (1991) (Ising) – affected Japan and South Korea.
- Typhoon Polly (1995) (18W, Ising) – approached Luzon before curving out to sea.
- Typhoon Olga (1999) (T9907, 11W, Ising) – killed 160 people in the Philippines before later affecting the Korean Peninsula.

== See also ==
Similar names that have been used for tropical cyclones:

- List of storms named Bising – also used in the West Pacific Ocean.
- List of storms named Isang – used in the West Pacific Ocean and in the South-West Indian Ocean.
