= List of storms named Susang =

The name Susang has been used to name six tropical cyclones in the Philippine Area of Responsibility in the Western Pacific Ocean, all named by the PAGASA. The name Susang replaced Sening after the latter was retired because of a 1970 typhoon:

- Typhoon Bess (1974) (T7423, 27W, Susang) – a minimal typhoon which nevertheless brought heavy rainfall to Luzon, Hainan, and Vietnam, resulting in 26 fatalities and 3 missing people; the name Bess was retired after this storm.
- Tropical Depression Susang (1978) – a weak system which affected Palau, the Philippines, and Vietnam.
- Typhoon Judy (1982) (T8218, 19W, Susang) – a Category 2-equivalent typhoon that made landfall in Japan, causing 26 fatalities and 8 missing people.
- Tropical Depression Susang (1986) – a weak tropical depression which was only recognized by PAGASA.
- Tropical Depression Susang (1990) – another short-lived tropical depression that was only monitored by the Japan Meteorological Agency (JMA) and PAGASA.
- Typhoon Fred (1994) (T9419, 19W, Susang) – a strong Category 4-equivalent typhoon which skirted Japan and Taiwan before making a devastating and deadly landfall in China, where it caused 3,063 deaths.

After the 2000 Pacific typhoon season, the PAGASA revised their naming lists and excluded Susang from their new lists.

== See also ==
Similar names that have been used for tropical cyclones:

- List of storms named Sisang – used in the Western Pacific Ocean.
- List of storms named Susan – used in the Western Pacific Ocean and two other tropical cyclone basins.
