= Tropical Depression Auring (2009) =

Pacific tropical depression in 2009

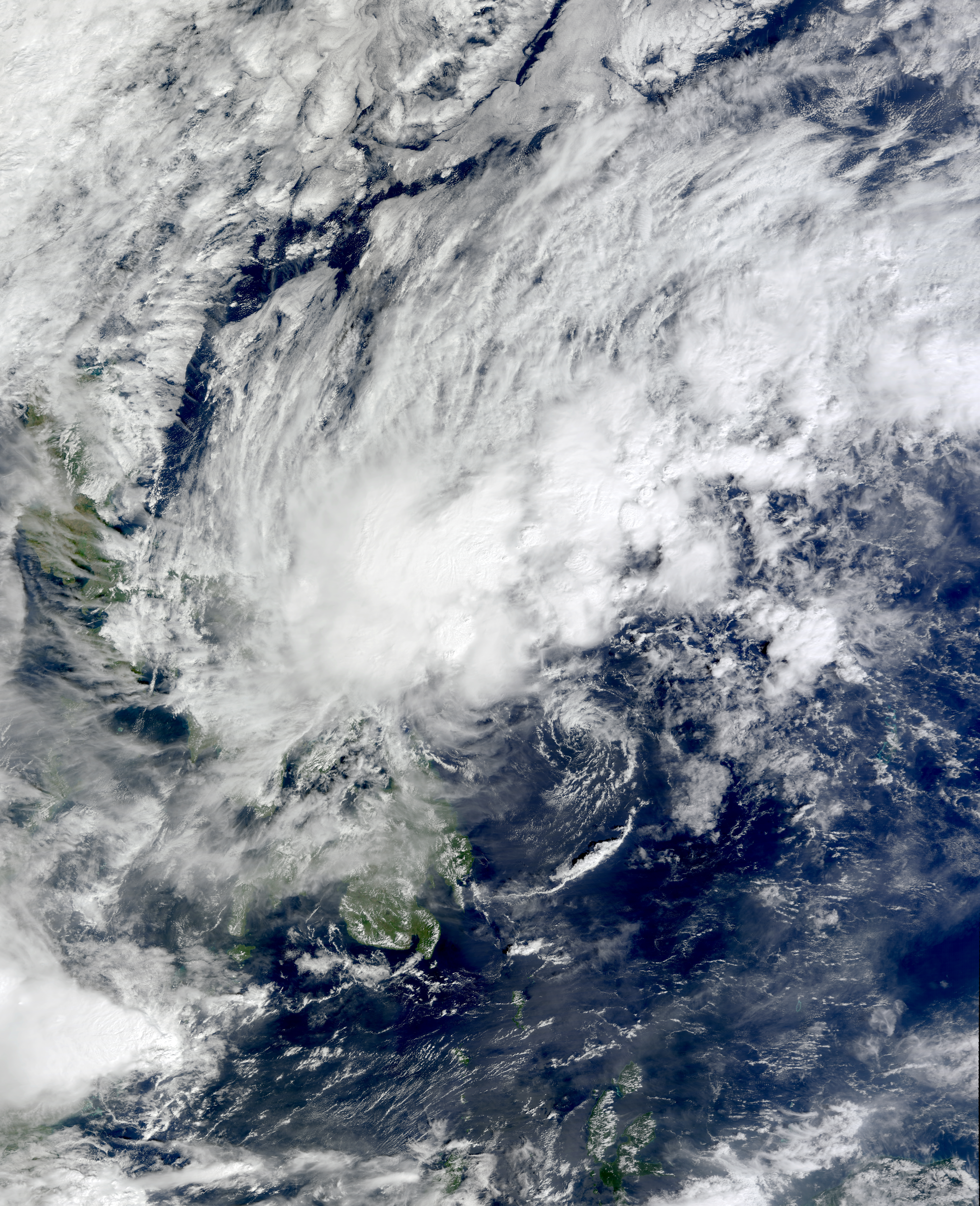
- Tropical Depression Auring on January 4

Meteorological history
- Formed: January 3, 2009
- Dissipated: January 6, 2009

Tropical depression
- 10-minute sustained (JMA)
- Highest winds: 45 km/h (30 mph)
- Lowest pressure: 1006 hPa (mbar); 29.71 inHg

Overall effects
- Fatalities: 1 direct, 1 indirect
- Missing: 9
- Damage: $490,000 (2009 USD)
- Areas affected: Philippines
- Part of the 2009 Pacific typhoon season

Tropical Depression Auring was a weak tropical cyclone that caused floods in the Philippines in early January 2009. It formed as a tropical disturbance late on December 30, 2008, to the southeast of Manila in the Philippines, and gradually developed over the next few days. Early on January 3, 2009, the Philippine Atmospheric, Geophysical and Astronomical Services Administration (PAGASA) and the Japan Meteorological Agency (JMA) reported that the disturbance had intensified into the first tropical depression of the season, with PAGASA assigning the name Auring to the depression. As the Depression was moving into a high level of vertical wind shear, it did not develop any further and late on January 5 as the baroclinic zone approached Auring, it was downgraded to an area of low pressure by the PAGASA before the JMA followed suit the next day as it was declared as dissipated by the JTWC.

Heavy rain from Auring produced severe flooding in the eastern Philippines. Two people were killed and nine others were left missing. A total of 305 homes were destroyed and another 610 were damaged. In addition, an estimated 53 hectares (130.9 acres) of rice and 3.5 hectares (8.6 acres) of corn were damaged. About 43,851 people were affected by the depression and damages were estimated at PHP 23 million ($490,000 USD).

== Meteorological history ==
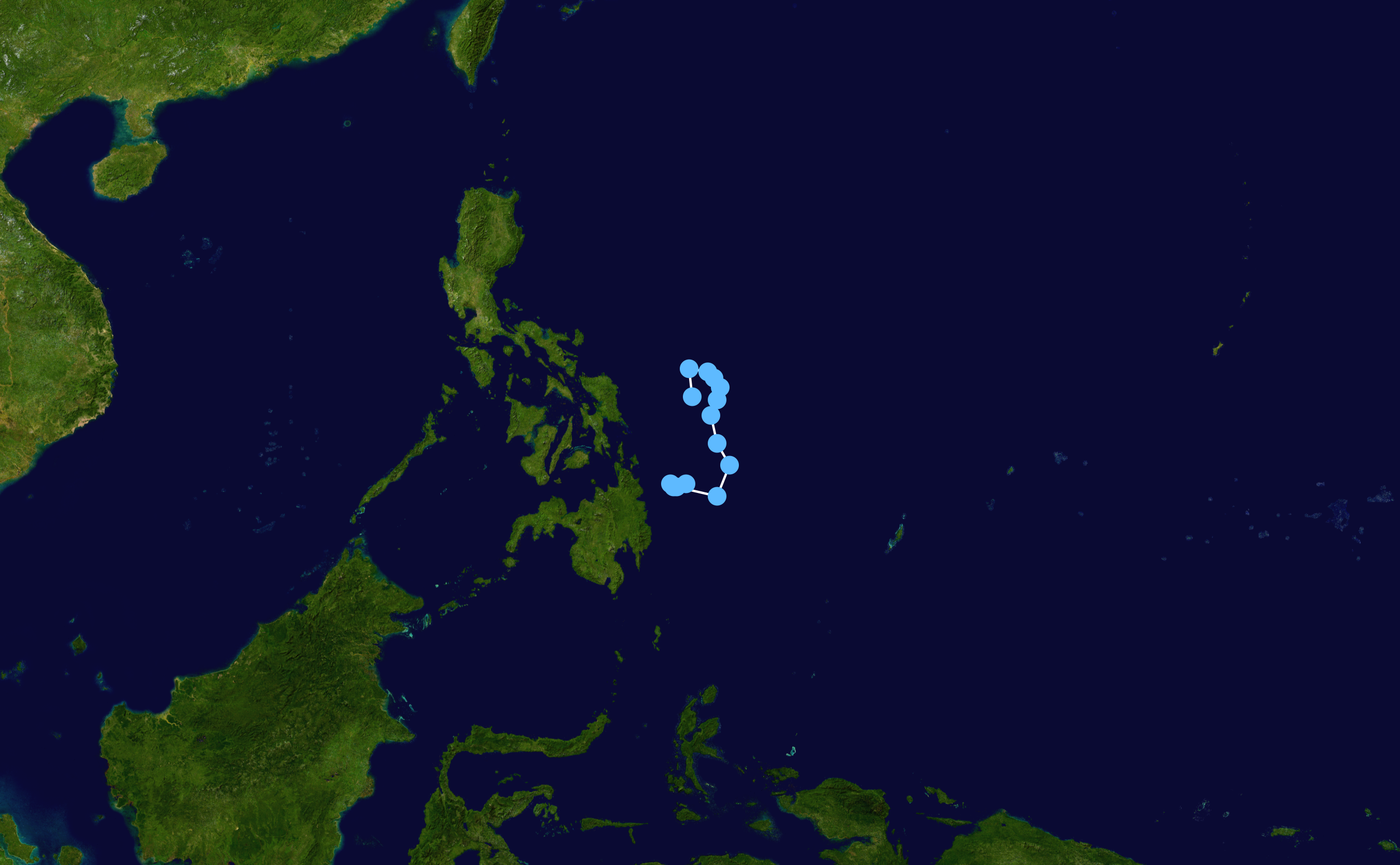
Map plotting the storm's track and intensity, according to the Saffir–Simpson scale Map key Saffir–Simpson scale Tropical depression (≤38 mph, ≤62 km/h) Tropical storm (39–73 mph, 63–118 km/h) Category 1 (74–95 mph, 119–153 km/h) Category 2 (96–110 mph, 154–177 km/h) Category 3 (111–129 mph, 178–208 km/h) Category 4 (130–156 mph, 209–251 km/h) Category 5 (≥157 mph, ≥252 km/h) Unknown Storm type Tropical cyclone Subtropical cyclone Extratropical cyclone, remnant low, tropical disturbance, or monsoon depression

Late on January 1, 2009, the Joint Typhoon Warning Center (JTWC) reported that an area of deep atmospheric convection had persisted for the last 48 hours about 730 km (455 mi), to the southeast of Manila in the Philippines. Deep convection was developing over the northern quadrant of a weak low level circulation center. A subtropical ridge of pressure was helping to guide the disturbance and was providing good outflow as well as low to moderate vertical wind shear. However, as the disturbance was moving into a higher level of vertical wind shear the depression was not expected to develop into a significant tropical cyclone within 48 hours. During the next 48 hours the disturbance gradually developed, with the Japan Meteorological Agency (JMA) and the Philippine Atmospheric, Geophysical and Astronomical Services Administration (PAGASA) reporting early on January 3 that it had become the first tropical depression of the season, with the name Auring being assigned to the depression by PAGASA whilst it was located about 140 km (85 mi) east of Surigao City on the Philippine island of Mindanao. This came after the low level circulation center had started to consolidate as deep convection was being fueled by a poleward diffluence despite being in an area of strong vertical wind shear. Over the next couple of days as Auring moved towards the east, dry air started to wrap in to its low level circulation center which started to weaken the depression after it had peaked with winds of 45 km/h, (30 mph) 10-min sustained and a minimum pressure of 1006 hPa (mbar) according to the JMA. As the baroclinic zone approached the depression late on January 5, PAGASA downgraded the depression to an area of low pressure as the baroclinic zone was approaching the depression, as vertical wind shear had increased and outflow became hindered. However the JMA continued to issue warnings on the depression until early the next morning when the depression was declared dissipated by the JTWC and the JMA.

== Preparations and impact ==
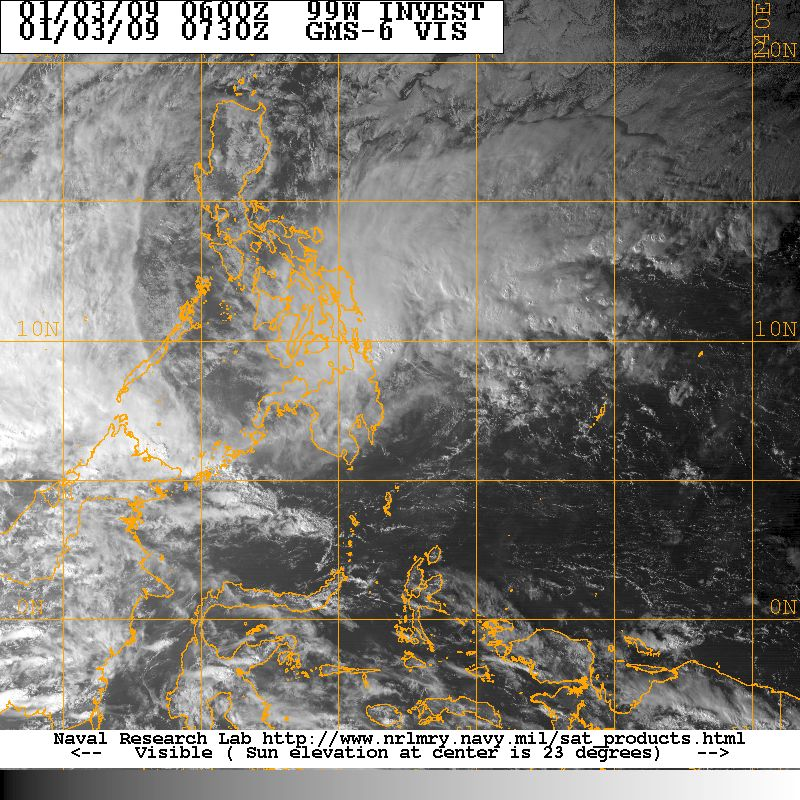
Tropical Depression Auring on January 3

Upon being classified as a tropical depression, the Philippine Atmospheric, Geophysical and Astronomical Services Administration issued Public Storm Warning Signal #1 for Samar, Leyte, the Camotes Islands, Surigao del Norte, Siargao Island, and Dinagat Island as winds up to 60 km/h (37 mph) were expected to affect those areas. Three hours later, Biliran Island was also put under the warning signal. On January 4, all signals, except in Eastern Samar, were lifted as Auring recurved and moved away from the Philippines. The warning signal for Eastern Samar was lifted early the next day.

Heavy rains from Auring triggered flooding across the eastern provinces of the Philippines. A total of 38,764 people were evacuated to avoid floodwaters. The rains caused the Cagayan River to swell, leading to the death of a 12-year-old boy in Gingoog. In Talisay City, Cebu, a 27-year-old woman was killed after she was electrocuted by a steel wire which was knocked down by high winds produced by Auring. Nine other people, all of whom are children, were listed as missing. About 12,211 people were left stranded at ports due to dangerous conditions caused by the depression. An additional 14 trucks, 44 light cars, 75 passenger buses, 27 vessels and 295 rolling cargoes were also stranded. Severe flooding destroyed 305 homes, 199 of which were in Macasandig. Another 610 homes sustained damage. An estimated 53 hectares (130.9 acres) of rice and 3.5 hectares (8.6 acres) of corn were damaged. About 43,851 people were affected by the storm, mainly along the Cagayan River. The remnants of Auring brought heavy rains to the flooded areas again on January 7, triggering several landslides which blocked off roads and damaging power lines, leaving parts of the Catanduanes without power for several hours. Damages from the depression were estimated at PHP 23 million ($490,000 USD) and an estimated 5,000 families were left homeless.

== Aftermath ==
The severe flooding on Siargao Island led to the issuance of a state of calamity. In addition to the state of calamity in Siargao Island, 16 villages within Cagayan de Oro were declared calamity areas. In the wake of Auring, the Department of Social Welfare and Development (DSWD) provided family food packets and assistance to flooded areas, valued at PHP 372,760 (US$7,940). Relief funds of PHP 292,189.11 (US$6,220), stockpiles of food valued at PHP 77,431.2 (US$1,650), and non-food items valued at PHP 413,568 (US$8,810) were available if needed. Residents who were left homeless in Iligan City were provided with assistance at an estimated cost of PHP 1.13 million (US$24,070).

The Robinson's Supermarket donated 97 packs of bihon, 77 packets of bihon palabok, 525 packs of misua, and 208 cans of carne norte; Cagayan de Oro Hotel and Restaurant Association donated 12 bags of linen; Nestlé provided 51 boxes of milo; Grains Retailers Confederations of the Philippines sent 30 sacks of rice; National Transmission Corporation provided nine boxes of assorted canned goods; Rotary International District 3870 donated six sacks of rice, one box of used clothing, and 40 loaves of bread; STI Rotary Club of Center Point provided 50 boxes assorted goods and food items; SM City Cagayan donated 180 family food packs; DYNAMIC Pharmacy provided one box of assorted medicine; Xavier Estates Catholic Groups sent assorted clothing and boxes of food; Bombo Radyo Philippines donated three boxes of bottled water and assorted food items, and PNRC provided 36 sacks of rice, 18 boxes of sardines, and 38 boxes of noodles.

== See also ==
- Other tropical cyclones named Auring
- Tropical Storm Lingling (2014)
- Tropical Storm Mekkhala (2015)
- Tropical Storm Bolaven (2018)
- Tropical Storm Thelma
