= List of storms named Bising =

The name Bising has been used for fifteen tropical cyclones in the Philippines by PAGASA and its predecessor, the Philippine Weather Bureau, in the Western Pacific Ocean.

- Tropical Depression Bising (1966) – only recognized by the Philippine Weather Bureau.
- Tropical Depression Bising (1970) – only recognized by the Philippine Weather Bureau.
- Typhoon Dinah (1974) (T7405, 06W, Bising) – struck the Philippines and Vietnam.
- Tropical Storm Polly (1978) (T7803, 03W, Bising) – struck southern Japan.
- Typhoon Nelson (1982) (T8202, 02W, Bising) – struck the Philippines.
- Typhoon Ken (1986) (T8602, 02W, Bising) – did not make landfall.
- Typhoon Ofelia (1990) (T9005, 06W, Bising) – struck Taiwan and China.
- Severe Tropical Storm Owen (1994) (T9401, 02W, Bising) – struck the Philippines.
- Typhoon Otto (1998) (T9802, 04W, Bising) – struck Taiwan and China.

Preceded by Akang	Pacific typhoon season names Bising	Succeeded by Klaring

The name Bising replaced the name Barok after the 2001 Pacific typhoon season following the change in the Philippine naming lists.

- Typhoon Sonca (2005) (T0503, 03W, Bising) – did not make landfall.
- Tropical Depression Bising (2009) – only recognized by PAGASA.
- Tropical Depression Bising (2013) – only recognized by the Japan Meteorological Agency (JMA) and PAGASA.
- Tropical Depression Bising (2017) – only recognized by JMA and PAGASA.
- Typhoon Surigae (2021) (T2102, 02W, Bising) – a long-lived storm that closely passed the Philippines as a powerful Category 5 super typhoon.
- Typhoon Danas (2025) (T2504, 05W, Bising) – a Category 3-equivalent typhoon that struck Taiwan and China.

Preceded by Auring	Pacific typhoon season names Bising	Succeeded by Chico

== See also ==
Similar names that have been used to name tropical cyclones:

- List of storms named Bining – also used in the Western Pacific Ocean.
- List of storms named Biring – also used in the Western Pacific Ocean.
- List of storms named Ising – also used in the Western Pacific Ocean.
