= List of storms named Sening =

The name Sening was used for two tropical cyclones worldwide, both in the Philippines by the Philippine Weather Bureau, the predecessor of PAGASA.

- Tropical Depression 30W (1966) (30W, Sening) – a tropical depression which was only recognized by the Philippine Weather Bureau and the Joint Typhoon Warning Center (JTWC).
- Typhoon Joan (1970) (T7019, 21W, Sening) – a powerful typhoon which impacted the Philippines and Hainan island.

The name Sening was retired after the 1970 season, and was replaced by Susang in 1974.
