= List of storms named Susan =

The names Susan and Sue have been used for fifteen tropical cyclones worldwide: one in the Central Pacific Ocean, one in the South Pacific Ocean, twelve in the Western Pacific Ocean, and one in the Australian region.

In the Central Pacific:

- Hurricane Susan (1978) – a Category 4 hurricane that initially tracked toward Hawaii before sharply veering away, resulting in no land effects

In the South Pacific:

- Cyclone Susan (1997–98) – a Category 5 severe tropical cyclone that became among the most intense tropical cyclones in the South Pacific and affected Vanuatu, Fiji, and New Zealand

In the Western Pacific:

- Typhoon Susan (1945)
- Typhoon Susan (1953) – a Category 3-equivalent typhoon that affected Hong Kong
- Typhoon Susan (1958) – a Category 3-equivalent typhoon
- Tropical Storm Susan (1961)
- Typhoon Susan (1963) – a Category 4-equivalent typhoon
- Typhoon Susan (1966) (Oyang)
- Typhoon Susan (1969) (T6903, 03W, Atring) – a Category 3-equivalent typhoon that affected the Caroline Islands and Philippines
- Typhoon Susan (1972) (Edeng)
- Tropical Storm Susan (1975)
- Tropical Storm Susan (1981)
- Tropical Storm Susan (1984) – made landfall in Vietnam, causing 33 fatalities
- Typhoon Susan (1988) (Biring)

In the Australian region:

- Cyclone Sue (1975) – a Category 1 tropical cyclone

== See also ==
- List of storms named Susang – a similar name that has also been used in the Western Pacific Ocean
