= Tropical Storm Mekkhala (2015) =

Pacific typhoon in 2015

Severe Tropical Storm Mekkhala (Amang)
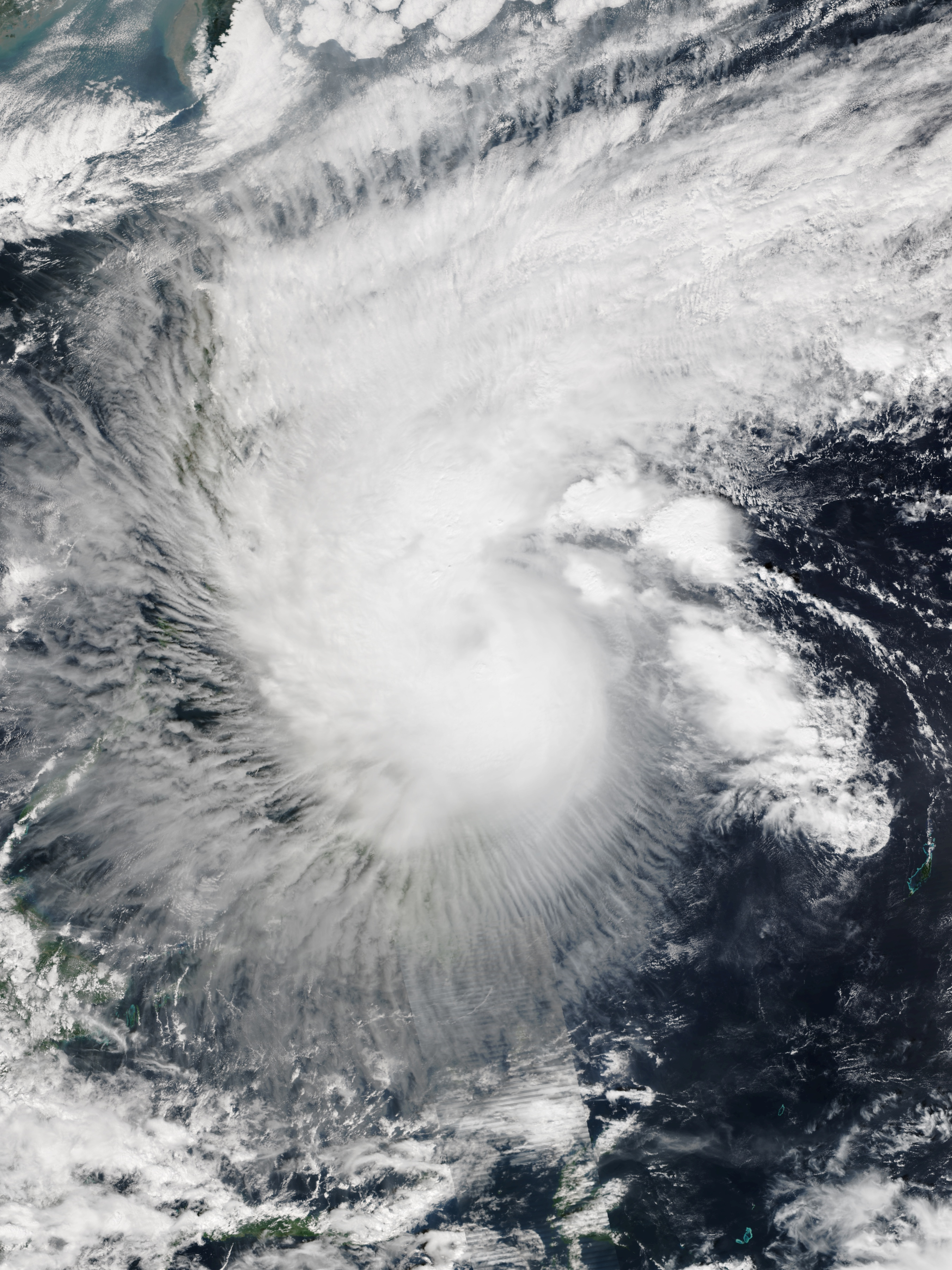
- Severe Tropical Storm Mekkhala at peak intensity on January 17

Meteorological history
- Formed: January 13, 2015
- Dissipated: January 21, 2015

Severe tropical storm
- 10-minute sustained (JMA)
- Highest winds: 110 km/h (70 mph)
- Lowest pressure: 975 hPa (mbar); 28.79 inHg

Category 1-equivalent typhoon
- 1-minute sustained (SSHWS/JTWC)
- Highest winds: 130 km/h (80 mph)
- Lowest pressure: 970 hPa (mbar); 28.64 inHg

Overall effects
- Fatalities: 3 total
- Damage: $8.92 million (2015 USD)
- Areas affected: Caroline Islands, Philippines
- IBTrACS
- Part of the 2015 Pacific typhoon season

Severe Tropical Storm Mekkhala, (Note: The name Mekkhala (Thai: เมขลา, [meːk˥˩ kʰa˧ laː˩˩˦]) was contributed by Thailand and refers to Manimekhala, a guardian-angel of the seas, in Thai.) known in the Philippines as Severe Tropical Storm Amang, was an early-season tropical cyclone that made landfall over the Philippines in mid-January 2015. Mekkhala killed three people in the Bicol Region and caused light crop damage. Notably, the storm disturbed Pope Francis’ visit to the country after the victims of Typhoon Haiyan on November 8, 2013. Although the storm also caused an airplane crash in Tacloban, nobody was hurt in the incident.

The system developed on January 13 between the Philippines and Guam. Moving west-northwest for its duration, Mekkhala passed north of Yap State on January 14 while slowly intensifying due to moderate wind shear. Conditions became more favorable on January 16, when the storm quickly strengthened to peak winds of at least 110 km/h (70 mph); a ragged eye prompted the American-based Joint Typhoon Warning Center (JTWC) to upgrade it to a typhoon. The storm weakened slightly and made landfall on the Philippine island of Samar on January 17. Mekkhala weakened further over land, dissipating on January 21 east of Luzon.

== Meteorological history ==
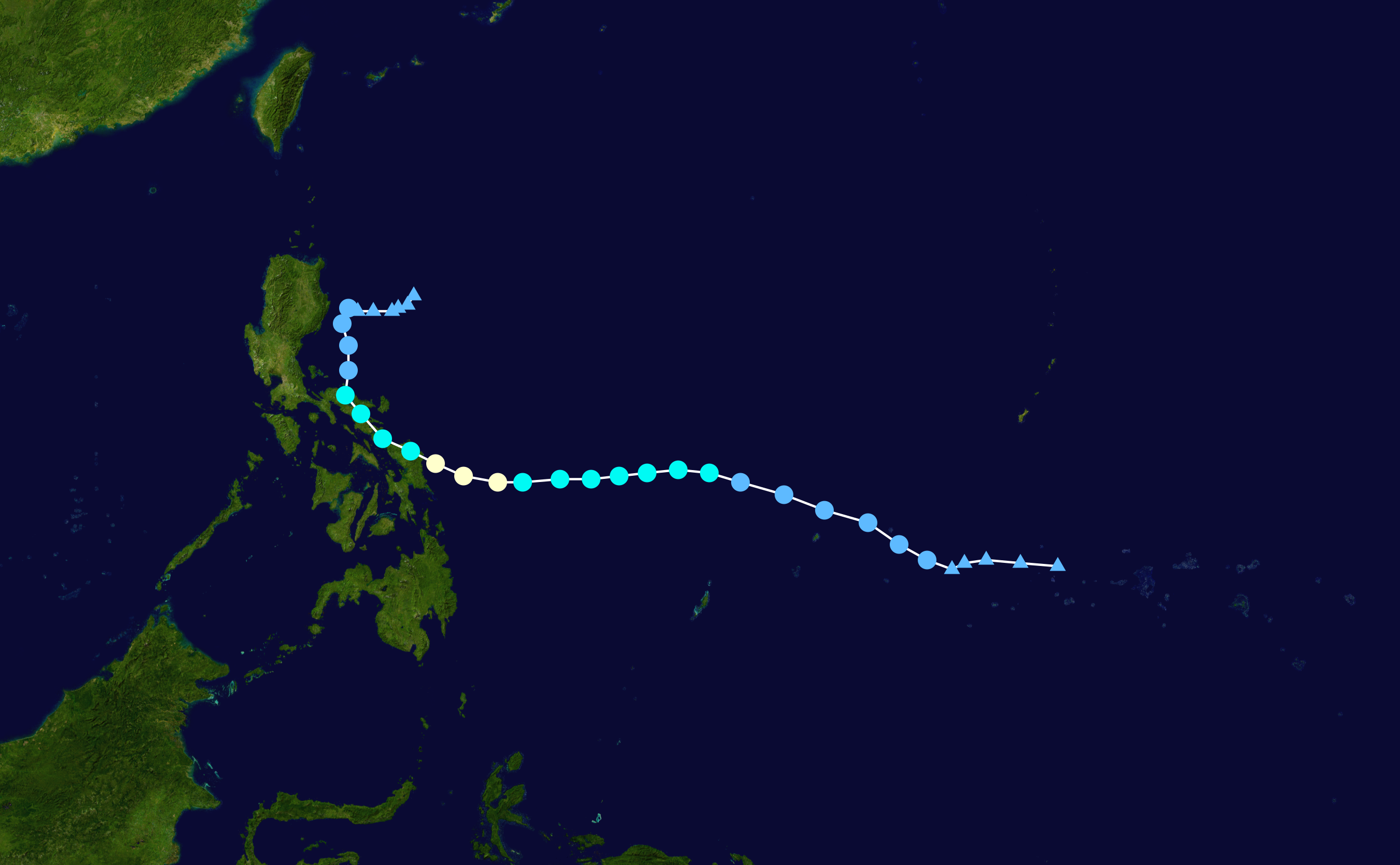
Map plotting the storm's track and intensity, according to the Saffir–Simpson scale Map key Saffir–Simpson scale Tropical depression (≤38 mph, ≤62 km/h) Tropical storm (39–73 mph, 63–118 km/h) Category 1 (74–95 mph, 119–153 km/h) Category 2 (96–110 mph, 154–177 km/h) Category 3 (111–129 mph, 178–208 km/h) Category 4 (130–156 mph, 209–251 km/h) Category 5 (≥157 mph, ≥252 km/h) Unknown Storm type Tropical cyclone Subtropical cyclone Extratropical cyclone, remnant low, tropical disturbance, or monsoon depression

Tropical Storm Mekkhala was first noted as a tropical disturbance on January 11, while it was located within a marginal environment for further development, about 205 km (125 mi) to the south-southwest of Chuuk State in the Federated States of Micronesia. At this time the system's low level circulation centre was broad and ill-defined, with a large band of deep atmospheric convection flaring along the centre's northern edge. Over the next day the system moved westwards into a more favourable environment, with atmospheric convection wrapping into a slowly-consolidating low-level circulation center. The Japan Meteorological Agency subsequently started to monitor the system as a tropical depression early on January 13. (Note: The Japan Meteorological Agency is the official Regional Specialized Meteorological Center for the western Pacific Ocean.) Later that day the United States Joint Typhoon Warning Center initiated advisories on the system and classified it as Tropical Depression 01W, despite tropical storm force winds of 65 km/h (40 mph) occurring on the northern side of the system. (Note: The Joint Typhoon Warning Center is a joint United States Navy – United States Air Force task force that issues tropical cyclone warnings for the western Pacific Ocean and other regions.)

Although deep convection was displaced to the northwest of an exposed LLCC early on January 14, the JMA still upgraded the system to a tropical storm and named it Mekkhala, under moderate vertical wind shear offset by excellent poleward outflow. In post-season analysis, the agency upgraded the storm at 12:00 UTC on the previous day. Late on January 14, the PAGASA named the storm Amang right after it entered the Philippine Area of Responsibility.

Severe Tropical Storm Mekkhala making landfall over the Samar

Tracking west-northwestward and then westward along the southern periphery of a subtropical ridge, Mekkhala was upgraded to a tropical storm by the JTWC early on January 15, due to its slightly improved structure. Mekkhala quickly intensified on the next day due to improved conditions; the wind shear became in-phase with the storm's motion while the robust divergent outflow persisted. Therefore, the JMA upgraded the system to a severe tropical storm at 06:00 UTC on January 16, and later that day the JTWC upgraded it to a typhoon, when a central dense overcast has significantly deepened and totally obscured the LLCC. Later, a microwave imagery revealed that Mekkhala formed a ragged eyewall structure. The system reached peak intensity at 00:00 UTC on January 17 with ten-minute maximum sustained winds of 110 km/h (70 mph), although operationally the JMA estimated typhoon-force winds of 130 km/h (80 mph).

After slightly weakening, Mekkhala tracked northwestward and made landfall over Dolores, Eastern Samar of the Philippines at around 15:00 Philippine Standard Time (07:00 UTC), where Typhoon Hagupit also made landfall the month before. Both the JMA and the JTWC downgraded Mekkhala to a tropical storm on January 17, due to land interaction weakening the storm significantly. Mekkhala weakened further while crossing the Bicol Region on January 18, leading the JTWC to downgrade it to a tropical depression when it turned northward and emerged into the Philippine Sea. Late on the same day, the JMA downgraded Mekkhala to a tropical depression, and shortly after the JTWC issued the final warning as strong wind shear exposed the LLCC. The tropical depression drifted northeastward and maintained its exposed low-level circulation east of Luzon, until the system was completely absorbed by a stationary front early on January 21.

== Impact ==
Animation of issued PSWS for Tropical Storm Mekkhala (Amang) when crossing and skirting the Philippines.

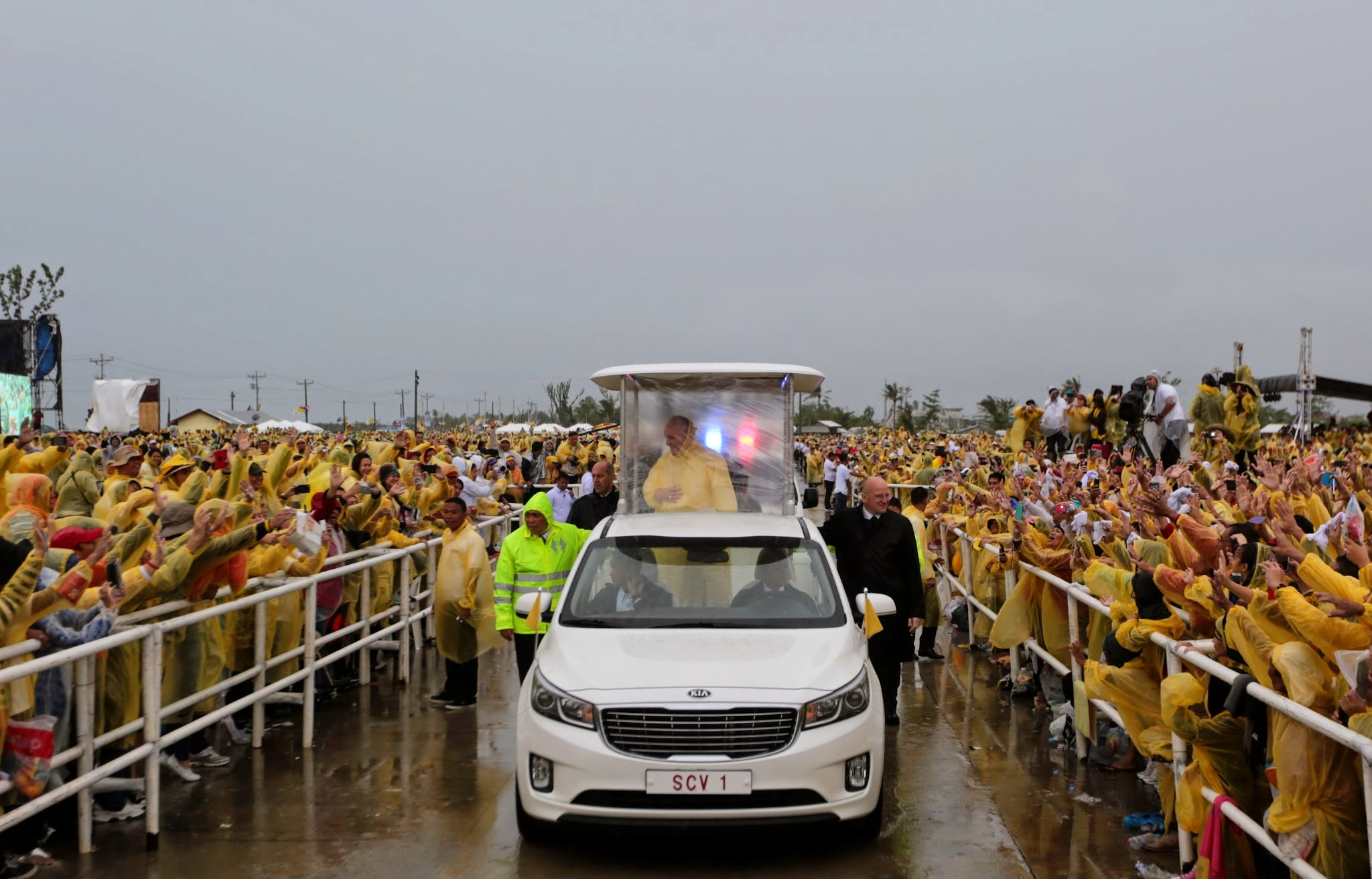
The site of the Papal Mass in Tacloban on January 17

During January 14, Mekkhala passed about 95 km (60 mi) to the north of Yap State and less than 45 km (30 mi) to the south of the atoll Ulithi. A peak wind gust of 58 km/h (36 mph) was recorded in Yap State, along with a rainfall total of around 13 mm (0.5 in). On Ulithi a rainfall total of 100 mm (4 in) was recorded, while there were no reports of any deaths or significant damage on either Ulithi or in Yap State.

Severe Tropical Storm Mekkhala, also known as Tropical Storm Amang, killed three people in the Bicol Region of the Philippines. Damage in the region amounted to ₱318.7 million (US$7.13 million), stemming mostly from agriculture. In addition, the storm caused agricultural damage of ₱30.3 million (US$678,000) in Samar. The crop damage and a subsequent drought caused rice shortages in the country, prompting the government to import the grain in May 2015. Throughout the country, 48 homes were destroyed while a further 490 sustained damage. Infrastructural losses reached ₱49.7 million (US$1.11 million); repairs to roadways was quick and completed by January 21. A volunteer from the Bicol Region, who worked for a Catholic Relief Services station in Salcedo, Eastern Samar, was hit by a soundbox due to a collapsed scaffolding caused by heavy winds during a papal Mass held in Daniel Z. Romualdez Airport in Tacloban, Leyte.

To comfort Tacloban people who suffered from the devastation caused by Typhoon Haiyan in 2013, and Typhoon Hagupit a month prior, Pope Francis visited the storm-ravaged city on January 17. However, the schedule was significantly impacted by Severe Tropical Storm Mekkhala and thousands of pilgrims and the Pope wore their raincoats during the rain-soaked Mass in the airport. Only minutes after Pope Francis’ aircraft left the airport, a private jet was veered off the runway by strong winds of Mekkhala and eventually crashed. The 15 passengers on the plane were all safe, including officials from the Cabinet of the Philippines.

=== Highest Public Storm Warning Signal ===
PSWS#	LUZON	VISAYAS	MINDANAO
PSWS #2	Catanduanes, Albay, Camarines Norte, Camarines Sur, Southern Quezon incl. Polillo Island, Sorsogon, Masbate	Northern Samar, Eastern Samar, Samar, Biliran	NONE
PSWS #1	Metro Manila, Cavite, Laguna, Rizal, Batangas, Bulacan, Nueva Ecija, Aurora, Quirino, Isabela, rest of Quezon, Marinduque, Oriental Mindoro, Romblon	Leyte, Southern Leyte, extreme Northern Cebu incl. Bantayan and Camotes Island	NONE

== See also ==
- Weather of 2015
- Tropical cyclones in 2015
- Tropical Depression Auring (2009)
- Tropical Storm Lingling (2014)
