= Tropical Depression Auring (2017) =

Pacific tropical depression in 2017

Tropical Depression 01W (Auring)
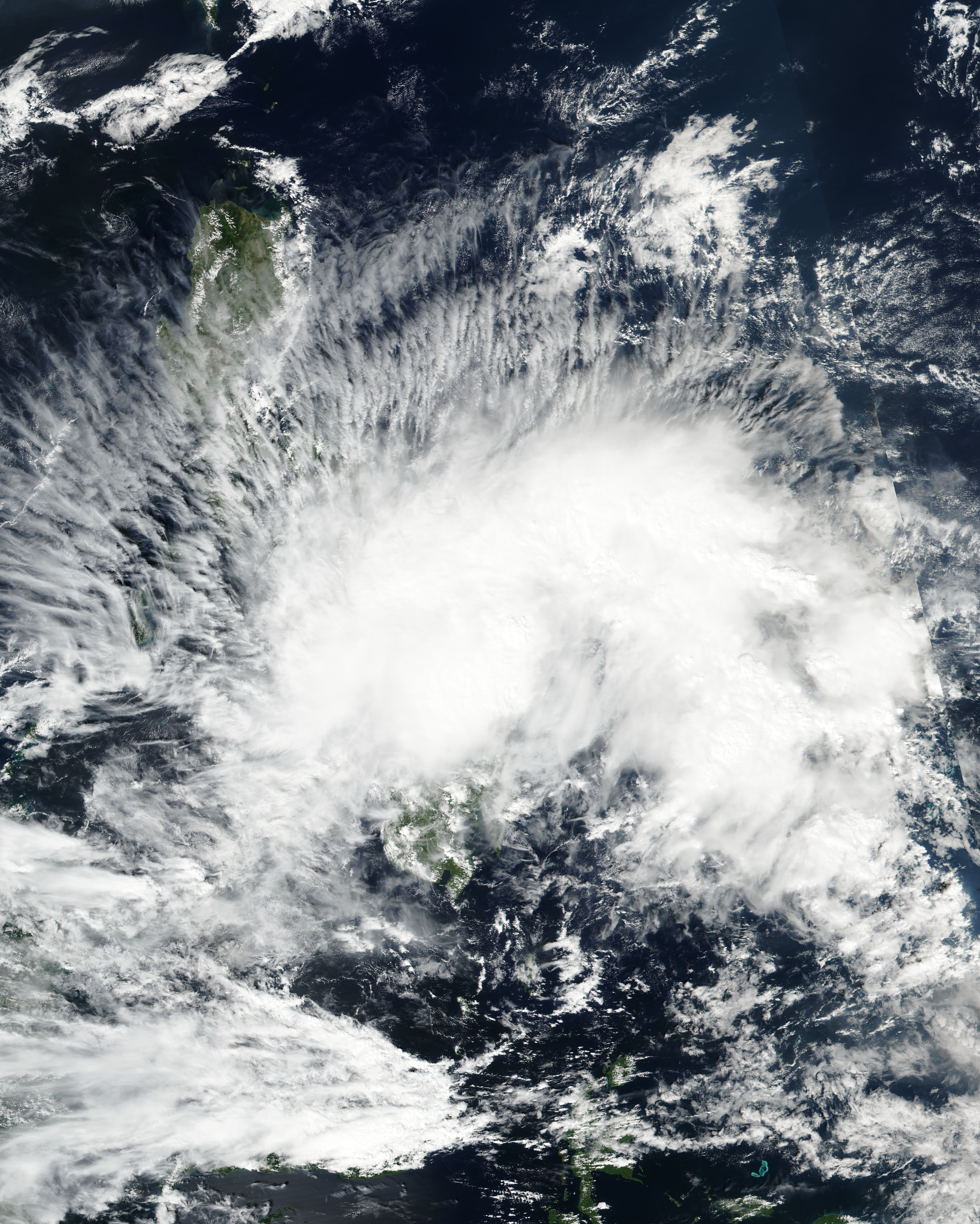
- Tropical Depression Auring approaching the Philippines on January 8

Meteorological history
- Formed: January 7, 2017
- Dissipated: January 16, 2017

Tropical depression
- 10-minute sustained (JMA)
- Highest winds: 55 km/h (35 mph)
- Lowest pressure: 1000 hPa (mbar); 29.53 inHg

Tropical depression
- 1-minute sustained (SSHWS/JTWC)
- Highest winds: 55 km/h (35 mph)
- Lowest pressure: 1000 hPa (mbar); 29.53 inHg

Overall effects
- Fatalities: 11 total
- Damage: $5.4 million (2017 USD)
- Areas affected: Philippines, Vietnam
- IBTrACS
- Part of the 2017 Pacific typhoon season

Tropical Depression Auring was a weak tropical cyclone which generated flooding over the southern Philippines in early January 2017. Forming as a tropical depression on January 7 east of Mindanao, Auring slowly moved northwestward and made landfall on the Siargao Island on the next day. After striking a few Filipino Islands and turning southwest, Auring weakened to a low-pressure area on January 10 over the Sulu Sea. The remnants then turned west-northwest and emerged into the South China Sea on January 11. It re-generated to a tropical depression on that day. Auring turned west-southwest on January 14, and weakened to a low-pressure again two days later, just south of Vietnam.

Despite not bringing damaging winds to the Philippines, Auring still brought heavy rainfall to the country. Flights and water transport were cancelled, resulted in thousands of people being stranded. Heavy rainfall flooded numerous villages in Mindanao. Landslides were reported in the region. Cebu also suffered from extensive flooding, particularly the southern part of the province. According to the news reports from the Philippines, two people were found dead after Auring. However, another report from AON revealed that 11 people were killed by Auring and its remnants. Damages in the country totalled at $5.4 million (2017 USD).

== Meteorological history ==
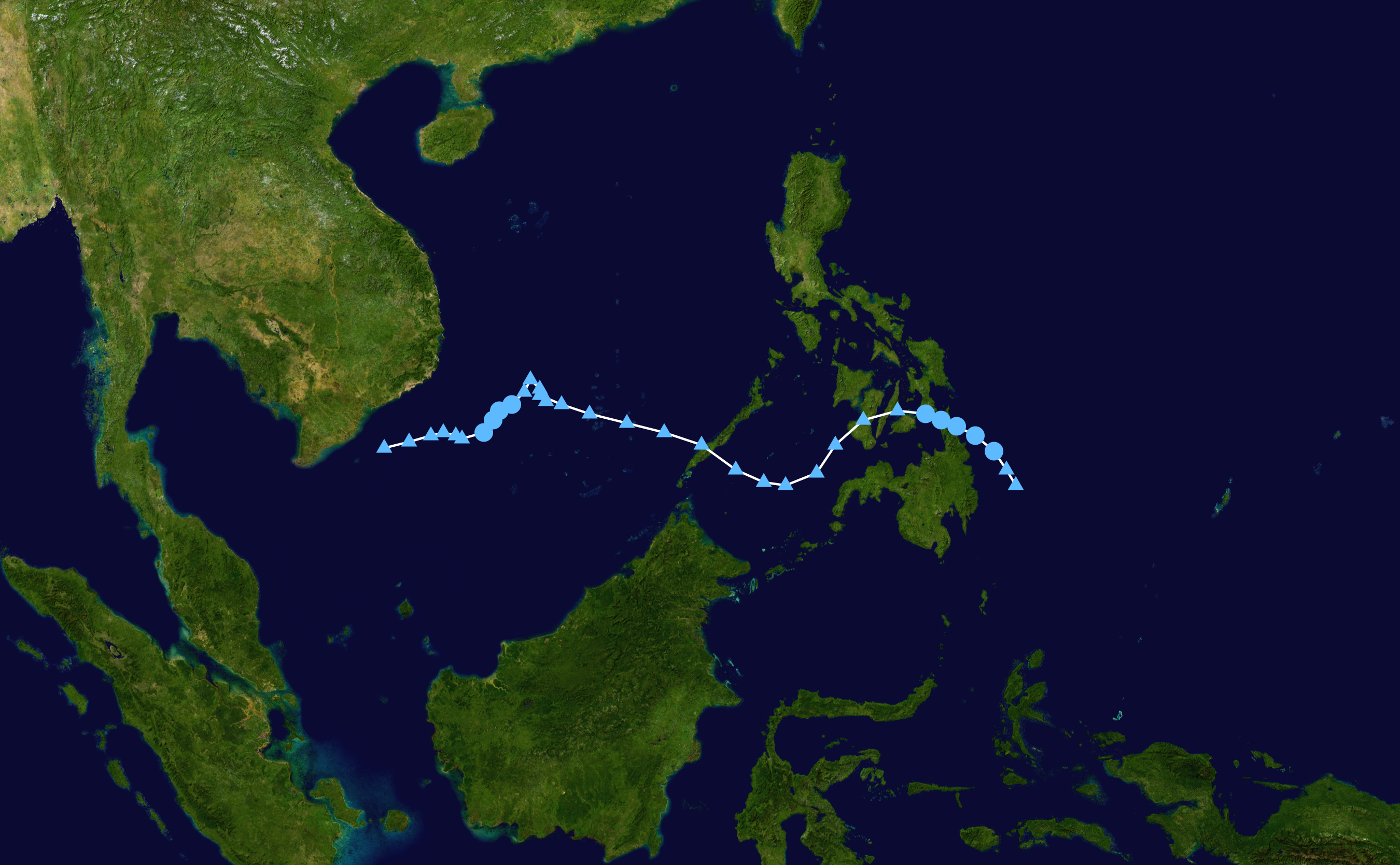
Map plotting the storm's track and intensity, according to the Saffir–Simpson scale Map key Saffir–Simpson scale Tropical depression (≤38 mph, ≤62 km/h) Tropical storm (39–73 mph, 63–118 km/h) Category 1 (74–95 mph, 119–153 km/h) Category 2 (96–110 mph, 154–177 km/h) Category 3 (111–129 mph, 178–208 km/h) Category 4 (130–156 mph, 209–251 km/h) Category 5 (≥157 mph, ≥252 km/h) Unknown Storm type Tropical cyclone Subtropical cyclone Extratropical cyclone, remnant low, tropical disturbance, or monsoon depression

At 00:00 UTC January 7, the Japan Meteorological Agency (JMA) first noted a tropical depression just off the coast of Mindanao. Three hours later, the Philippine Atmospheric, Geophysical and Astronomical Services Administration (PAGASA) classified the system as a tropical depression, and assigned the local name Auring. Later that day, a large area of convection burst over the system, though the center was elongated. The Joint Typhoon Warning Center (JTWC) followed suit and assigned it as 01W. The system moved west-northwest as steered by a subtropical ridge to its north. Due to proximity to land, Auring couldn't intensified much. At 15:00 PST (07:00 UTC) January 8, Auring made landfall on the Siargao Island. The system then struck Dinagat Islands at 16:00 PST (08:00 UTC) and Panaon Island at 18:00 PST (10:00 UTC). At 04:45 PST January 9 (20:45 UTC January 8), Auring made its fourth landfall in Ubay, Bohol. Early on January 9, the PAGASA downgraded it to a low-pressure area and issued its final advisory on the system, due to continuous land interaction. A few hours later, the JTWC also issued its final warning on it. Auring turned southwestward later that day, and emerged into the Sulu Sea. Early on January 10, the JMA downgraded it to a low-pressure area.

The remnants of Auring emerged into the South China Sea on January 11, and the JMA re-classified the system as a tropical depression on that day. However, the system remained disorganized while moving west-northwest slowly for a couple of days. Late on January 13, deep convection burst over the center, as benefit from good poleward outflow, sea surface temperature of 27–28 °C (81–82 °F) and moderate wind shear. Despite continuous effect of wind shear, deep convection was able to wrap into the western part of the center, which prompted the JTWC to issue a Tropical Cyclone Formation Alert (TCFA) early on January 14 while turning west-southwest. On the next day, the JTWC upgraded it to a tropical depression again, as deep convection completely wrapped into the center. Auring continued to move west-southwest slowly under a low-to mid-level ridge to its north. Nevertheless, wind shear soon increased and the convection was sheared to the northwest. On January 16, the JTWC issued the final warning for the system again as the center was completely exposed. Auring dissipated later that day while just south of Vietnam.

== Preparations and impact ==
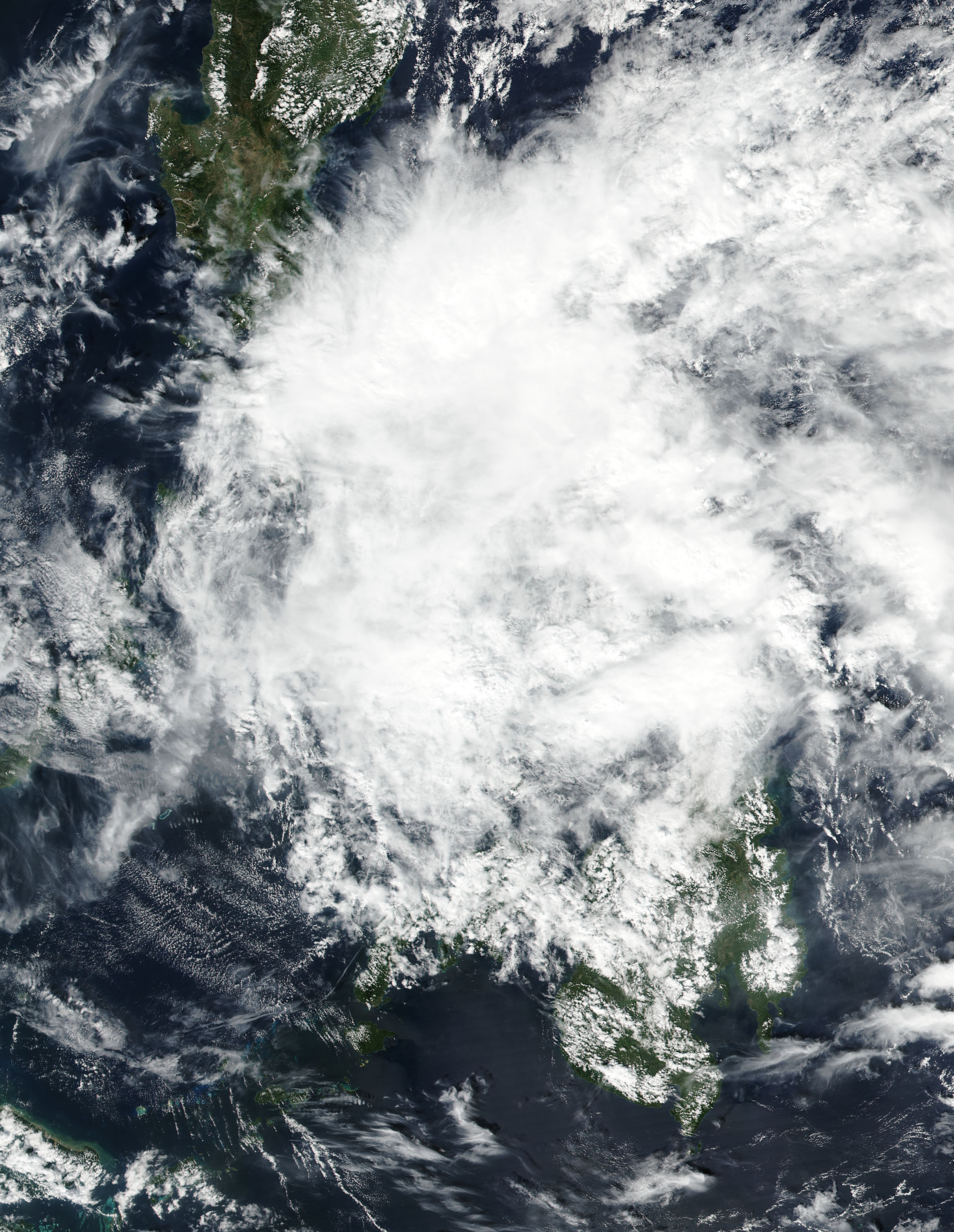
Tropical Depression Auring over the Visayas on January 9

Shortly after being designated as a tropical depression on January 7, the PAGASA issued the TCWS #1 for Caraga. Later that day, the TCWS #1 extended to the provinces in Davao Region and Northern Mindanao. On January 8, the TCWS #1 extended to northern Lanao del Sur, northern Zamboanga del Norte, Southern Leyte, provinces in Central Visayas and Western Visayas as Auring approached the country. The TCWS was gradually lifted as Auring made landfall and weakened. All the TCWS were cancelled as Auring weakened to a low-pressure area.

Due to adverse weather, two domestic flights from Philippine Airlines were cancelled in January 8, while six domestic flights from Philippine Airlines, Cebu Pacific, and AirAsia Zest were cancelled on January 9. The Philippine Coast Guard (PCG) cancelled all sea transport in Surigao del Norte, Dinagat Islands, Southern Leyte, and Cebu. Small sea vessels were not allowed to enter the waters in eastern Mindanao. As a result, over 2,000 people were stranded in Nasipit and Surigao City. Another 1,986 people were stranded in Iloilo and Negros Occidental as the PCG cancelled sea transport between Panay, Guimaras Island and Negros Island. School classes in Bayugan, Kapalong, Biliran, Agusan del Norte, Surigao del Sur, Surigao del Norte, Dinagat Islands, Bohol, and Cebu were suspended on January 9. 217 people in San Miguel, Surigao del Sur were evacuated due to the threat of Auring. Although Auring weakened to a low-pressure area after landfall, it still brought rainfall to the south-central Philippines. Two domestic flights from Cebu Pacific were cancelled on January 11. School classes in Albay were also suspended on that day.

Heavy rains from Auring caused flooding in Surigao del Sur and Agusan del Sur, which inundated roads and bridges. Auring also triggered landslides in Surigao del Sur, Agusan del Norte and Agusan del Sur. 11 villages in Compostela Valley were also inundated. Despite weakened to a low-pressure area before striking Cebu, Auring still triggered widespread flooding, particularly the southern part of the province. Rainfall in Cebu City reached 64 mm (2.5 in). Floodwaters in Mandaue was about 2–3 ft (61–91 cm). People in the city refused to evacuate despite being told by the officials. 11 people were trapped off the coast of Boljoon after the boats experienced propeller failure, despite the PCG cancelled all water transport in Cebu. They were rescued by the Cebu PDRRMO. Only scattered showers rains and gusty winds were felt in Lapu-Lapu City, and the city didn't experience major impacts. Toledo experienced severe flooding, with floodwaters reached chest-deep. Roads were damaged by the floods. A minor landslide was reported in the city. Flooding also affected Negros Occidental and inundated 414.5 ha (1,024 acres) of farms. 532 farmers in the province were affected. Damage in agriculture amounted to ₱7.3 million (US$147,000).

As reported by the Filipino media, Two people were found dead after Auring. A teenager girl in Toledo drowned when she was crossing a river on her way to school, though the classes were already suspended on that day, while a boy in Mandaue was missing after being swept away by a river. He was confirmed dead a day later. However, a report from AON stated that 11 people were killed by the flooding which was related to Auring and its remnants. Across the country, 43,071 people were affected by Auring, in which 35,038 people were evacuated in advance. A house in Cortes, Surigao del Sur were destroyed, while another house in Cabadbaran, Agusan del Norte were damaged. Total loss of the depression reached ₱268 million (US$5.4 million).

== See also ==
- Weather of 2017
- Tropical cyclones in 2017
- Tropical Storm Wukong (2012)
- Tropical Storm Podul (2013)
- Tropical Storm Sinlaku (2014)
- Tropical Storm Bolaven (2018)
