= Tropical Storm Bolaven (2018) =

Pacific tropical storm in 2018

Tropical Storm Bolaven (Agaton)
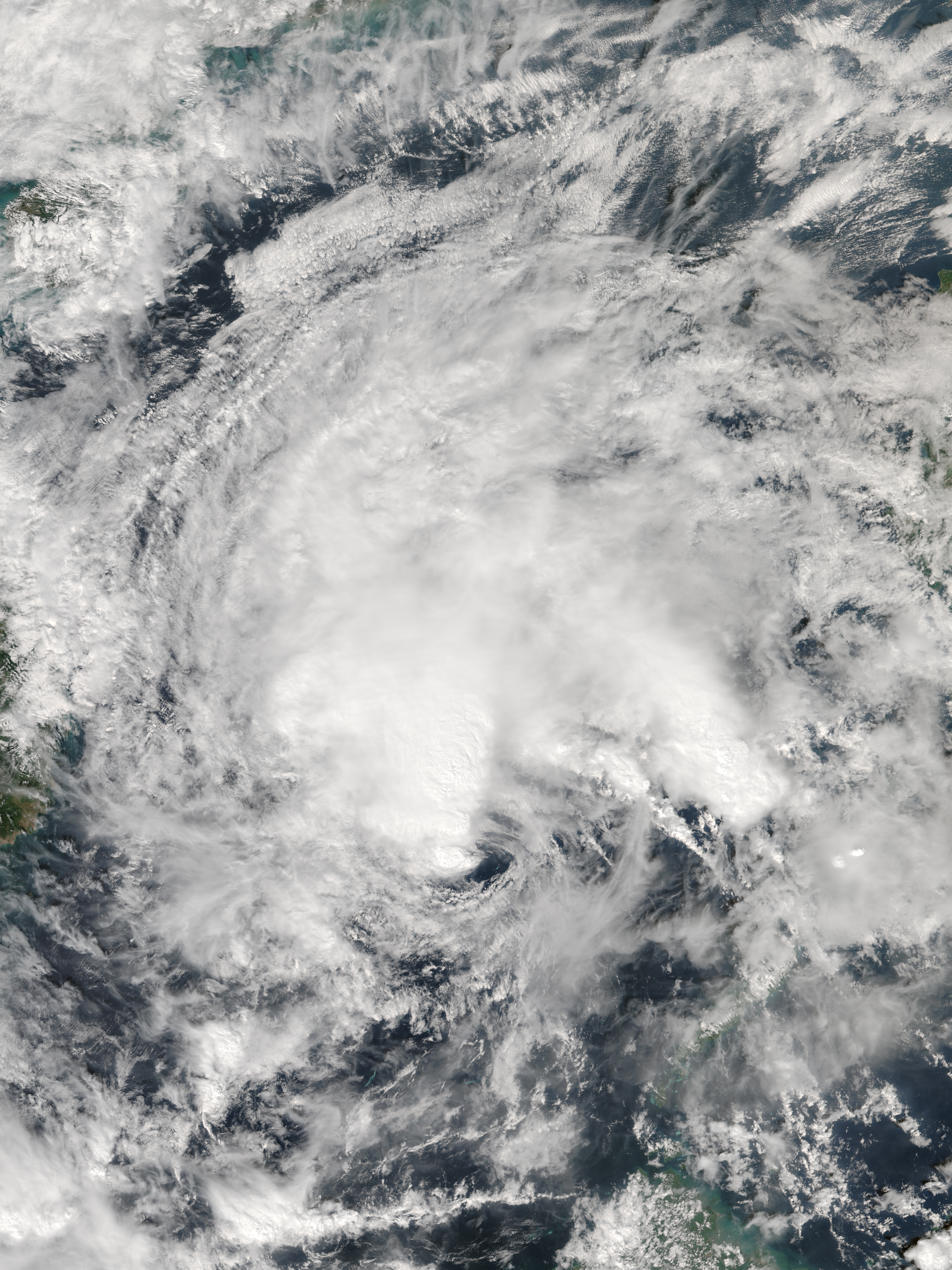
- Tropical Storm Bolaven at peak intensity on January 3

Meteorological history
- Formed: December 29, 2017
- Dissipated: January 4, 2018

Tropical storm
- 10-minute sustained (JMA)
- Highest winds: 65 km/h (40 mph)
- Lowest pressure: 1002 hPa (mbar); 29.59 inHg

Tropical storm
- 1-minute sustained (SSHWS/JTWC)
- Highest winds: 65 km/h (40 mph)
- Lowest pressure: 1001 hPa (mbar); 29.56 inHg

Overall effects
- Fatalities: 4 total
- Damage: $10.5 million (2018 USD)
- Areas affected: Philippines (specifically Mindanao, the Visayas, and Palawan)
- IBTrACS
- Part of the 2017 and 2018 Pacific typhoon seasons

Tropical Storm Bolaven, (Note: The name Bolaven (Lao: ບໍລະເວນ, [bɔː˩ la˧ ʋeːn˦˥]) was contributed by Laos and refers to Bolaven Plateau in Lao.) known in the Philippines as Tropical Storm Agaton, was an early-season tropical cyclone that affected southern parts of the Philippines in early January 2018. The first named storm of the 2018 Pacific typhoon season, (Note: The system formed in December 2017; however, it was not named until 2018 and used 2018's naming scheme.) Bolaven formed as a tropical depression near Palau on December 29, 2017. The system moved generally westwards without intensifying and made landfall over northeastern Mindanao on January 1, 2018. The depression spent the next day traversing the Philippines, making four more landfalls in the Visayas and one in Palawan. The system strengthened into a tropical storm on January 3 as it entered the South China Sea, receiving the name Bolaven. However, Bolaven weakened back to a tropical depression just a day later amid a marginal environment and dissipated on January 4 east of Vietnam.

Bolaven brought heavy rain to areas that had been recently impacted by Tropical Storm Kai-tak and Typhoon Tembin. More than 230,000 families in the Philippines were affected and at least 11,000 people sought shelter in evacuation centers. Floods and landslides killed four people across the country, while damaging houses and blocking roads. Maritime transport was greatly disrupted, with rough seas stranding over 3,600 people in various ports. Schools across the country were also shut at various points between January 1 and 3. Economic losses in the Philippines reached ₱554.7 million (US$10.53 million), mostly caused by crop damage. (Note: All currencies are in their 2018 values and are converted to United States dollars using data from the International Monetary Fund published by the World Bank.)

== Meteorological history ==
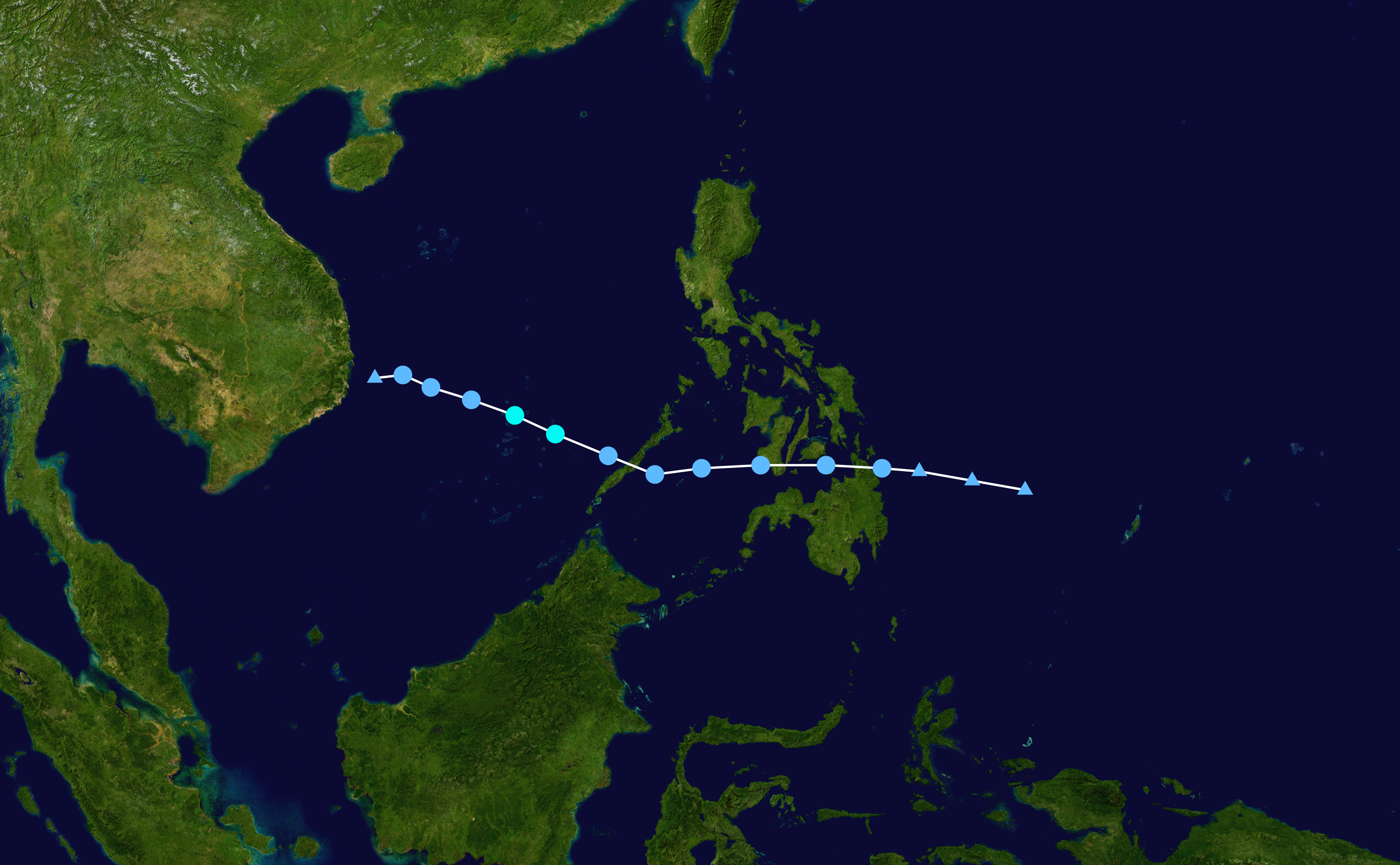
Map plotting the storm's track and intensity, according to the Saffir–Simpson scale Map key Saffir–Simpson scale Tropical depression (≤38 mph, ≤62 km/h) Tropical storm (39–73 mph, 63–118 km/h) Category 1 (74–95 mph, 119–153 km/h) Category 2 (96–110 mph, 154–177 km/h) Category 3 (111–129 mph, 178–208 km/h) Category 4 (130–156 mph, 209–251 km/h) Category 5 (≥157 mph, ≥252 km/h) Unknown Storm type Tropical cyclone Subtropical cyclone Extratropical cyclone, remnant low, tropical disturbance, or monsoon depression

On December 29, 2017, the Japan Meteorological Agency (JMA) began to track a tropical depression about 370 km (230 mi) east of Palau. (Note: The Japan Meteorological Agency is the official Regional Specialized Meteorological Center for the western Pacific Ocean.) The system moved northwest for about half a day before turning to the west on December 30. Initially broad and ill-defined, the system began to organize slowly on January 1, 2018, as evidenced by increased thunderstorm activity and banding features. This prompted the United States-based Joint Typhoon Warning Center (JTWC) and the Philippine Atmospheric, Geophysical and Astronomical Services Administration (PAGASA) to upgrade the system to a tropical depression; the latter gave it the local name Agaton. At this time, the system was tracking quickly west under the influence of a subtropical ridge. The depression reached the Philippines on January 1, making landfall over Bucas Grande at 17:00 UTC, then at Claver, Surigao del Norte at 17:15 UTC. The system crossed the Bohol Sea before making a third landfall near Jagna, Bohol at 20:00 UTC, a fourth in Santander, Cebu at 21:00 UTC, and a fifth in Bais, Negros Oriental at 23:30 UTC. The depression then entered the Sulu Sea on January 2.

Despite the warm waters of the Sulu Sea, strong easterly upper-level winds kept thunderstorms to the northwest of the depression's low-level circulation center, thereby preventing intensification. The depression continued to be steered west by the subtropical ridge and made a sixth landfall near Aborlan, Palawan at 14:45 UTC on January 2. The system turned slightly northwards as it entered the South China Sea. At 00:00 UTC on January 3, the depression intensified into a tropical storm and was named Bolaven by the JMA. At that time, the system possessed maximum sustained winds of 65 km/h (40 mph) and a central pressure of 1,002 hPa (29.6 inHg). Three hours later, Bolaven moved west-northwest out of the Philippine Area of Responsibility. Persistent wind shear and marginal sea surface temperatures, however, caused the system to degrade back to a depression by January 4. With no thunderstorm activity near the system's center, Bolaven dissipated as a tropical cyclone just off Vietnam's South Central Coast at 12:00 UTC on January 4.

== Preparations and impacts ==
Bolaven, known in the Philippines as Tropical Depression Agaton, was the third system to impact the Visayas and Mindanao since December 2017, after tropical storms Kai-tak (Urduja) and Tembin (Vinta). The National Disaster Risk Reduction and Management Council (NDRRMC) began evacuations on December 30, 2017, with a total of 353 families evacuated from Zamboanga del Norte and Agusan del Sur. On January 1, 2018, Tropical Cyclone Warning Signal #1 was raised in 16 provinces of Mindanao, mostly in the Caraga and Davao Regions. Later that day, the warning area was expanded westwards to the Zamboanga Peninsula, six provinces in the Visayas, and Palawan. Three municipal government units in Bohol issued mandatory evacuation orders for their residents ahead of dangerous floods. The warning area shifted west away from Mindanao and towards Western Visayas on January 2, following the anticipated path of the storm. The Department of Social Welfare and Development (DSWD) readied ₱704 million (US$13.4 million) worth of funds and relief items for use. Sea vessels were barred from leaving Cebu province, stranding nearly 1,200 passengers; in total, port closures across the Philippines affected over 3,600 passengers. Bus trips in Negros Oriental were cancelled. In Misamis Oriental, 132 individuals were forced to evacuate because of flooding. Later on January 2, all signals in the Visayas were cancelled, signifying diminishing winds. However, dangers posed by heavy rainfall and turbulent seas persisted. Schools Capiz and Palawan were closed on January 3. A total of 40 domestic flights were cancelled from January 1 to 3. Warnings in Palawan were lowered on January 3, as Agaton entered the South China Sea.

Bolaven brought heavy rains and high winds to 236,449 families in four regions across the Philippines. A total of 11,109 people sought shelter in 45 evacuation centers. Rainfall totals peaked at 565.9 mm (22.28 in), recorded at a weather station in Sorsogon. Heavy rain caused 248 incidents of flooding in the Bicol Region and the Western Visayas. Roughly 200 houses in Mandaue City were inundated. The NDRRMC received 162 reports of damaged houses. A landslide killed two people in Cebu, while another landslide injured a family of five in Libacao. Two people drowned in rivers: a man fishing along a river in Calinog was caught off guard by a strong current, while a woman attempting to cross a river in Libacao was overwhelmed and swept away. A family of four in Tobias Fornier was injured when gusty winds uprooted a tree that fell on their house. Offshore, two fishermen from Iloilo went missing on December 30, 2017, but were found safe a week later sheltering in Palawan. A brief power outage occurred in Cuyo, Palawan. Three roads each in the Bicol Region and the Eastern Visayas were rendered impassable, while floods blocked five roads in Capiz province. Two more road blockages occurred in the Western Visayas. Total damage was recorded at ₱554.7 million (US$10.53 million), mostly coming from crop damage.

Following the storm, a state of calamity was declared for the municipalities of Panitan and Pontevedra in Capiz, as well as Magsaysay municipality in Palawan. The DSWD, local government units, and non-governmental organizations provided ₱2.03 million (US$38,500) worth of assistance. The City Disaster Risk Reduction and Management Council in Puerto Princesa distributed 785 family food packs to affected barangays.

== See also ==
- Other tropical cyclones named Bolaven
- Other tropical cyclones named Agaton
- Weather of 2018
- Tropical cyclones in 2018
- Tropical Depression Auring (2009) – affected Mindanao and the Eastern Visayas in early January
- Tropical Storm Washi (2011) – took a similar path across the Southern Philippines but was much more deadly
- Tropical Storm Jangmi (2014) – affected Southern Philippines in late December
