= List of storms named Huaning =

The name Huaning has been used for seventeen tropical cyclones in the Philippine Area of Responsibility by PAGASA and its predecessor, the Philippine Weather Bureau, in the Western Pacific Ocean.

- Typhoon Cora (1964) (T6406, 08W, Huaning) – struck the Philippines.
- Typhoon Shirley (1968) (T6809, 13W, Huaning) – struck the Philippines and Hong Kong as a typhoon.
- Tropical Depression Huaning (1972)
- Typhoon Ruby (1976) (T7608, 08W, Huaning) – struck the Philippines as a typhoon before curving through Japan as a Category 4 typhoon.
- Tropical Storm Herbert (1980) (T8006, 07W, Huaning) – struck the Philippines, Hainan, and Northern Vietnam
- Tropical Storm Gerald (1984) (T8410, 11W, Huaning) – affected China and Hong Kong
- Typhoon Warren (1988) (T8806, 06W, Huaning) – brushed Luzon in the Philippines.
- Tropical Storm Lois (1992) (T9212, 12W, Huaning) – didn't affect land.
- Typhoon Herb (1996) (T9609, 10W, Huaning) – struck Ryukyu Islands, Taiwan and China.
- Severe Tropical Storm Bolaven (2000) (T0006, 11W, Huaning) – affected Japan and South Korea.

Preceded by Gloring	Pacific typhoon season names Huaning	Succeeded by Isang

- Severe Tropical Storm Yutu (2001) (T0107, 10W, Huaning) – affected Hainan and nearby areas in China
- Severe Tropical Storm Sanvu (2005) (T0510, 10W, Huaning) – brushed the northern parts of Luzon and China
- Tropical Depression Huaning (2009) (06W, Huaning) – affected Taiwan.
- Typhoon Soulik (2013) (T1307, 07W, Huaning) – struck Taiwan and China.
- Tropical Storm Haitang (2017) (T1710, 12W, Huaning) – struck Taiwan and China
- Tropical Storm Lupit (2021) (T2109, 13W, Huaning) – struck China and Taiwan
- Tropical Storm Lingling (2025) (T2512, 18W, Huaning) – stuck Japan.

Preceded by Gorio	Pacific typhoon season names Huaning	Succeeded by Isang
