= 2019 Pacific typhoon season =

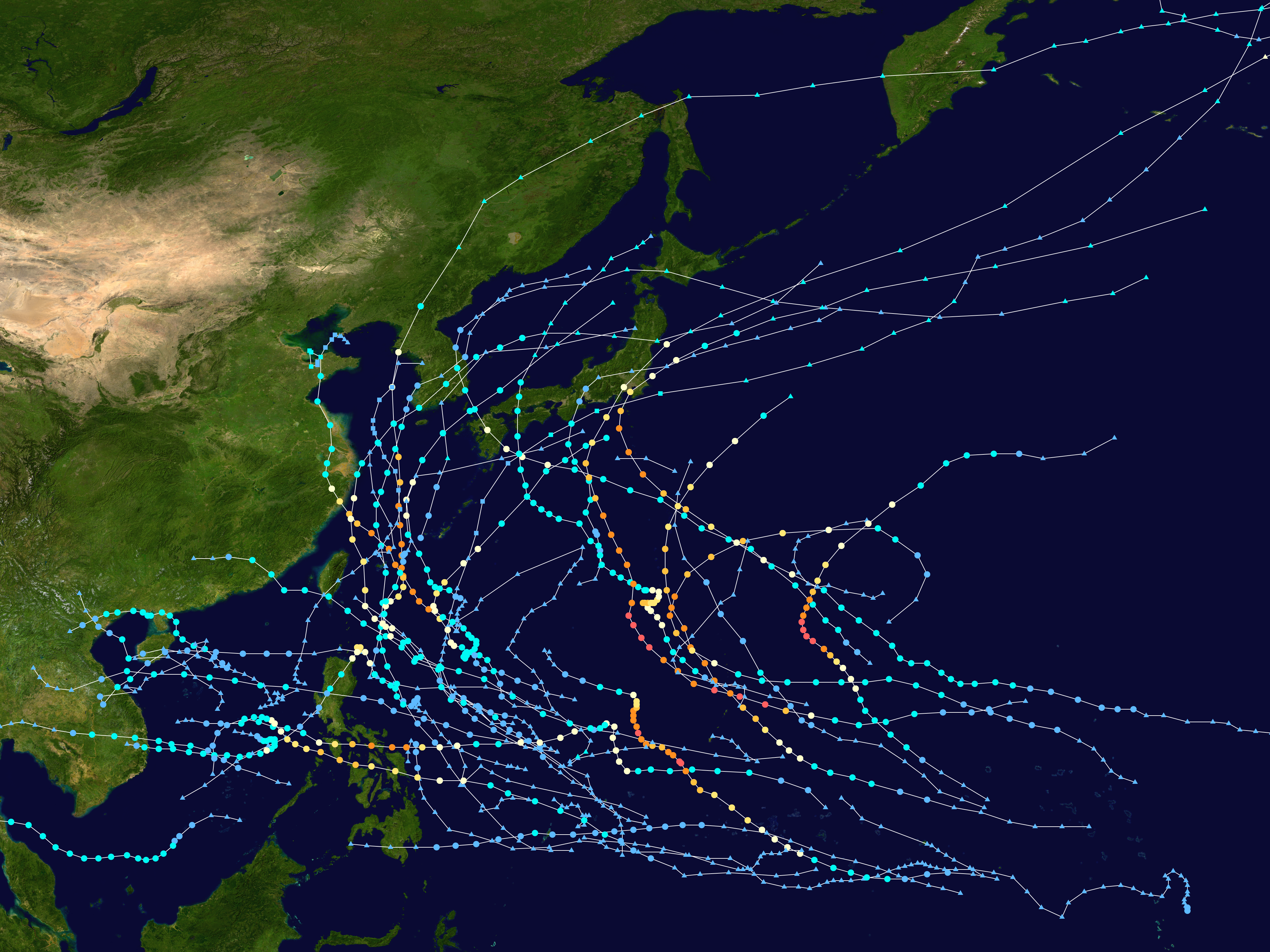
- Season summary map

Seasonal boundaries
- First system formed: December 31, 2018
- Last system dissipated: December 29, 2019

Strongest storm
- Name: Halong
  - Maximum winds: 215 km/h (130 mph) (10-minute sustained)
  - Lowest pressure: 905 hPa (mbar)

Seasonal statistics
- Total depressions: 49
- Total storms: 29
- Typhoons: 17
- Very strong typhoons: 9
- Violent typhoons: 4
- Total fatalities: 453 total
- Total damage: $38.54 billion (2019 USD) (Second-costliest Pacific typhoon season on record)

Related articles
- Timeline of the 2019 Pacific typhoon season; 2019 Atlantic hurricane season; 2019 Pacific hurricane season; 2019 North Indian Ocean cyclone season

The 2019 Pacific typhoon season was a devastating season that became the second-costliest on record, mainly due to the catastrophic damage wrought by typhoons Lekima, Faxai, and Hagibis. The season was the fifth and final consecutive to have above average tropical cyclone activity that produced a total of 29 named storms, 17 typhoons, and 5 super typhoons. The season ran throughout 2019, though most tropical cyclones typically develop between May and November. The season's first named storm, Pabuk, reached tropical storm status on January 1, becoming the earliest-forming tropical storm of the western Pacific Ocean on record, breaking the previous record that was held by Typhoon Alice in 1979. The season's first typhoon, Wutip, reached typhoon status on February 20. Wutip further intensified into a super typhoon on February 23, becoming the strongest February typhoon on record, and the strongest tropical cyclone recorded in February in the Northern Hemisphere. The season's last named storm, Phanfone, dissipated on December 29 after it made landfall in the Philippines.

In early August, Typhoon Lekima made landfall in China's Zhejiang province as a powerful typhoon, producing extensive rainfall and landslides that warranted over $9 billion worth of damages, making it, at the time, the second-costliest storm in Chinese history. September saw Typhoon Faxai brush Japan's Kantō region as a strong typhoon, causing extensive destruction. One month later, in early October, Typhoon Hagibis made landfall just west—at Shizuoka—as a large typhoon, causing extensive damages worth over $17 billion, making it, at that time, the costliest Pacific typhoon on record (unadjusted for inflation), until Typhoon Doksuri surpassed it four years later. The Philippines saw two destructive storms wreak havoc across the nation in December. Typhoon Kammuri made landfall in Bicol Region as a large, powerful Category 4-equivalent typhoon in early December, while Typhoon Phanfone made landfall in the central region of the country three weeks later, causing at least 50 deaths.

The scope of this article is limited to the Pacific Ocean to the north of the equator between 100°E and 180th meridian. Within the northwestern Pacific Ocean, two separate agencies assign names to tropical cyclones which can often result in a cyclone having two names. The Japan Meteorological Agency (JMA) will name a tropical cyclone should it be judged to have 10-minute sustained wind speeds of at least 65 km/h (40 mph) anywhere in the basin, while the Philippine Atmospheric, Geophysical and Astronomical Services Administration (PAGASA) assigns names to tropical cyclones which move into or form as a tropical depression in their area of responsibility located between 135°E–115°E and between 5°N–25°N regardless of whether or not a tropical cyclone has already been given a name by the JMA. Tropical depressions that are monitored by the United States' Joint Typhoon Warning Center (JTWC) are given a number with a "W" suffix.

== Seasonal forecasts ==
| TSR forecasts Date | Tropical storms | Total Typhoons | Intense TCs | ACE | Ref. |
|---|---|---|---|---|---|
| Average (1965–2018) | 26 | 16 | 9 | 295 | |
| May 7, 2019 | 27 | 17 | 10 | 354 | |
| July 5, 2019 | 25 | 15 | 8 | 260 | |
| August 7, 2019 | 26 | 16 | 8 | 270 | |
| Other forecasts Date | Forecast Center | Period | | Systems | Ref. |
| February 7, 2019 | PAGASA | January–March | | 1–2 tropical cyclones | |
| February 7, 2019 | PAGASA | April–June | | 2–4 tropical cyclones | |
| July 15, 2019 | PAGASA | July–September | | 6–9 tropical cyclones | |
| July 15, 2019 | PAGASA | October–December | | 3–5 tropical cyclones | |
| 2019 season | Forecast Center | Tropical cyclones | Tropical storms | Typhoons | Ref. |
| Actual activity: | JMA | 50 | 29 | 17 | |
| Actual activity: | JTWC | 30 | 29 | 18 | |
| Actual activity: | PAGASA | 21 | 15 | 7 | |

During the year, several national meteorological services and scientific agencies forecast how many tropical cyclones, tropical storms, and typhoons will form during a season and/or how many tropical cyclones will affect a particular country. These agencies included the Tropical Storm Risk (TSR) Consortium of University College London, PAGASA and Taiwan's Central Weather Bureau.

The first forecast of the year was released by PAGASA on February 7, within its seasonal climate outlook for the period January–June. The outlook noted that one to two tropical cyclones were expected between January and March, while two to four were expected to develop or enter the Philippine Area of Responsibility between April and June. Moreover, PAGASA predicts an 80% chance of a weak El Niño presence during February–March–April period. On May 7, the TSR issued their first forecast for the season, predicting that the 2019 season would be a slightly above average season, producing 27 named storms, 17 typhoons, and ten intense typhoons. One of the factors behind this is due to the possible development of a moderate El Niño anticipated within the third quarter of the year.

On July 5, the TSR released their second forecast for the season, now lowering their numbers and predicting that the season would be a below-average season with 25 named storms, 15 typhoons, and eight intense typhoons. The PAGASA issued their second forecast for the season on July 15, predicting six to nine tropical cyclones expected to develop or enter their area between July and September and about three to five tropical cyclones by September to December. The agency also predicted that the weak El Niño was expected to weaken towards neutral conditions by August and September 2019. On August 7, the TSR released their final forecast for the season, predicting a near-normal season with 26 named storms, 16 typhoons and eight intense typhoons.

== Season summary ==
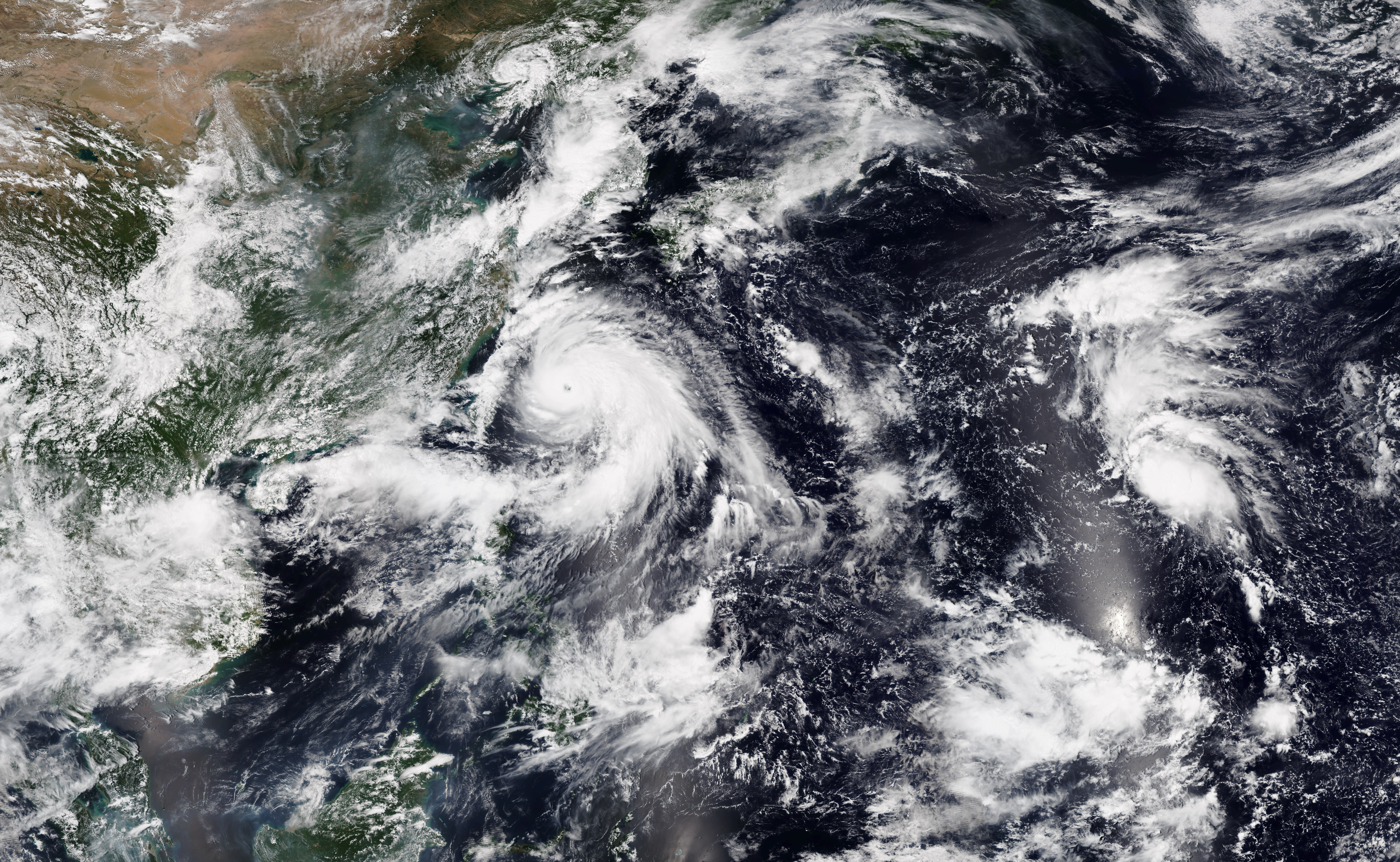
On September 5, three storms were active simultaneously: Kajiki (left), Lingling (center), and Faxai (right).

2019 was a fairly-above average season. It featured 50 tropical cyclones, 29 named storms, 17 that became typhoons and five became super typhoons. Throughout the year, there were at least 389 deaths from several storms, making the season the least deadly since 2015. A record of $34.14 billion in damages were recorded, making 2019 the costliest Pacific typhoon season on record, only surpassing with the previous season.

The first half of the season was considerably inactive, despite opening up with a developing area of low pressure which absorbed the remnants of Tropical Depression Usman from the 2018 season just to the south of Vietnam. The system, shortly thereafter, strengthened into Tropical Storm Pabuk, which became the first named storm of the season. Four days later, Pabuk make landfall in Thailand and exited the basin and into the Bay of Bengal. In that same month, Tropical Depression 01W (Amang) affected eastern Philippines bringing torrential rainfall. The next named storm, Typhoon Wutip, strengthened into a Category 5-equivalent super typhoon and became the most powerful February typhoon on record, surpassing Typhoon Higos in 2015. Several tropical depressions developed during the months of March and May, however none strengthened into named storms. The month of June was unusually quiet with two storms forming in total. June did include Tropical Storm Sepat, which affected mainland Japan bringing gusty winds and a tornado. Tropical Storm Sepat was only classified as a subtropical storm by the JTWC.

Costliest known Pacific typhoon seasons
| Rank | Total damages | Season |
|---|---|---|
| 1 | $38.54 billion | 2019 |
| 2 | $38.06 billion | 2023 |
| 3 | $30.59 billion | 2018 |
| 4 | $29.62 billion | 2024 |
| 5 | $26.45 billion | 2013 |
| 6 | $21.05 billion | 2012 |
| 7 | $18.77 billion | 2004 |
| 8 | $17.44 billion | 1991 |
| 9 | $17.18 billion | 2000 |
| 10 | $16.96 billion | 2016 |

In July, four named storms developed and affected land: Mun, which affected South China, Danas and Nari, which affected mainland Japan, and Wipha which also affected South China. None of the storms, however, reached typhoon intensity, which is very rare for the month of July. By August, tropical activity began to increase with the development of three simultaneous typhoons. Typhoon Francisco affected Japan and the Korean Peninsula. Typhoon Lekima reached Category 4-equivalent super typhoon intensity east of Taiwan and made landfall in Zhejiang of eastern China. Lekima brought total damages of $9.28 billion, making it the fifth costliest typhoon and the costliest typhoon in China. Typhoon Krosa formed as a Category 3 typhoon and made landfall in Japan as a severe tropical storm. Tropical Storms Bailu and Podul impacted Taiwan and the Philippines respectively as well as southern China but caused minimal damage.

In September, five tropical cyclones formed, including Typhoon Faxai, which made landfall in Japan as a Category 4-equivalent typhoon on September 8 causing landslides and damage that left a total of $10 billion in damages and three fatalities. Typhoon Tapah killed three people in Japan, and damage left behind in South Korea reached a total of ₩2.96 billion (US$2.48 million) and Japan's agricultural damage was amounted to be ¥583 million (US$5.42 million). Typhoon Mitag caused havoc in Western China and Taiwan, claiming three lives. Mitag also caused fourteen fatalities as it impacted the Korean Peninsula. The typhoon caused a total of $816 million in damages. During October, four cyclones formed, including the fourth-strongest tropical cyclone worldwide in 2019, Typhoon Hagibis, formed on October 4 near the Marshall Islands, and soon became the second-strongest tropical cyclone of the season when it explosively intensified into a Category 5-equivalent super typhoon. Hagibis made landfall in Japan as a Category 2 typhoon, causing major damage in the country, killing 98 people and causing a total $18 billion in damage; making it the costliest typhoon at the time.

In the month of November, six named storms were recorded, which is the most active since 1991, including the most intense tropical cyclone of the season, Halong, formed on November 1 and became a Category 5 super typhoon four days later with 10-minute sustained winds of 215 km/h (134 mph) and with a minimum pressure of 905 millibars. In late-November, Kammuri formed and became a Category 4 typhoon on the Saffir-Simpson Wind Scale, and made landfall in the Philippines on November 30 causing 17 fatalities and dealing $130 million in damages. The month of December was quiet, however, another typhoon, Phanfone, formed on December 19. Phanfone made landfall in the Philippines on December 25 on Christmas Day as a Category 2 typhoon, the first storm to do so since Typhoon Nock-ten in 2016. Phanfone dissipated on December 29 after striking the Philippines, leaving a total of 50 people dead and causing $67.2 million in damages.

The Accumulated Cyclone Energy (ACE) index for the 2019 Pacific typhoon season as calculated by Colorado State University using data from the Joint Typhoon Warning Center was 276.8 units. Broadly speaking, ACE is a measure of the power of a tropical or subtropical storm multiplied by the length of time it existed. It is only calculated for full advisories on specific tropical and subtropical systems reaching or exceeding wind speeds of 39 miles per hour (63 km/h).

== Systems ==
=== Tropical Storm Pabuk ===
- Tropical storm (JMA)
- Tropical storm (SSHWS)
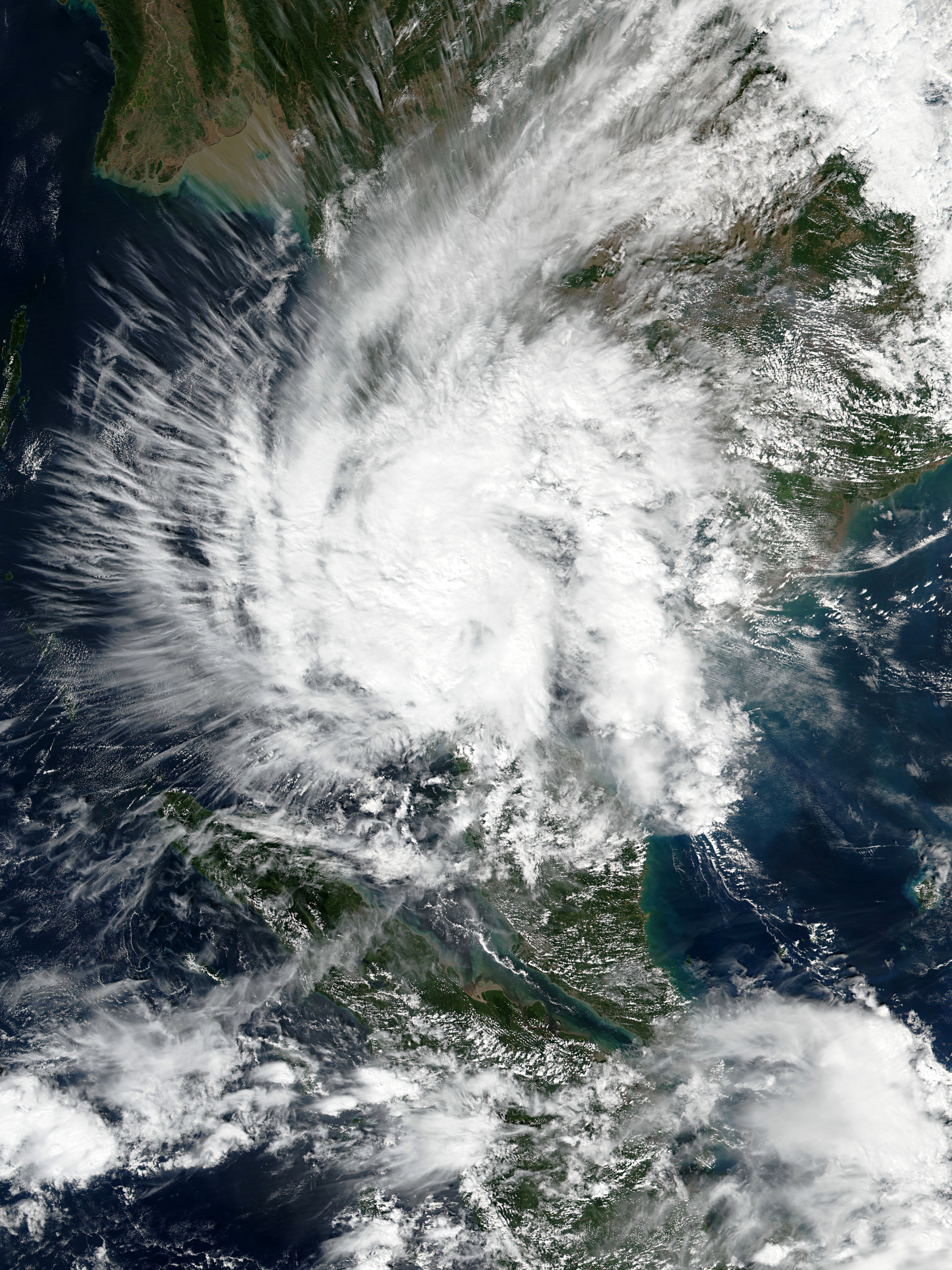
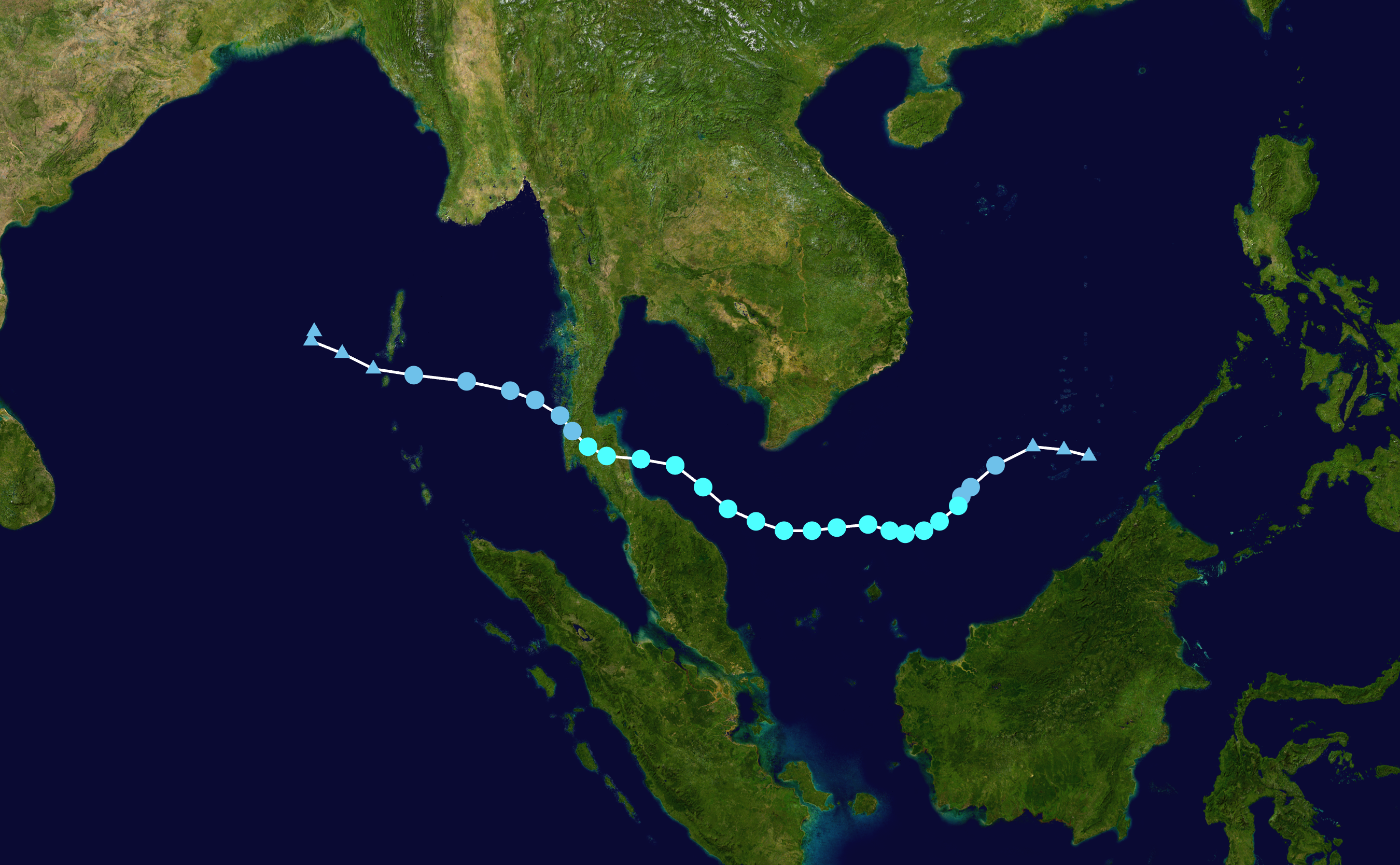
- Duration: December 31, 2018 – January 4, 2019 (Exited basin)
- Peak intensity: 85 km/h (50 mph) (10-min); 996 hPa (mbar)

A tropical disturbance formed over the southern portion of the South China Sea on December 28, 2018, which absorbed the remnants of Tropical Depression 35W (Usman) on December 30. Under high vertical wind shear, the low-pressure area remained disorganized until December 31 when it was upgraded to a tropical depression by both the JMA and the JTWC. As it was designated 36W by the JTWC, it was unofficially the last system of the 2018 typhoon season. At around 06:00 UTC on January 1, 2019, the system was upgraded to the first tropical storm of the 2019 typhoon season and named Pabuk by the JMA, surpassing Typhoon Alice in 1979 to become the earliest-forming tropical storm in the northwest Pacific Ocean on record. At that time, Pabuk was about 650 km (400 mi) southeast of Ho Chi Minh City, Vietnam and drifted westward slowly with a partially exposed low-level circulation center.

Under marginal conditions including warm sea surface temperatures, excellent poleward outflow but strong vertical wind shear, Pabuk struggled to intensify further for over two days until it accelerated west-northwestward and entered the Gulf of Thailand on January 3, where vertical wind shear was slightly weaker. It became the first tropical storm over the gulf since Muifa in 2004. Moreover, it tried to form an eye revealed by microwave imagery. On January 4, the Thai Meteorological Department reported that Pabuk had made landfall over Pak Phanang, Nakhon Si Thammarat at 12:45 ICT (05:45 UTC), although other agencies indicated a landfall at peak intensity between 06:00 and 12:00 UTC. Pabuk became the first tropical storm to make landfall over southern Thailand since Linda in 1997. Shortly after 12:00 UTC, the JMA issued the last full advisory for Pabuk as it exited the basin into the North Indian Ocean.

In Vietnam, Pabuk caused one death, and the losses were estimated at ₫27.87 billion (US$1.2 million). Eight people in Thailand were killed, and the losses in the country were estimated to be 3 billion bahts (US$93.8 million). Pabuk also killed one person in Malaysia.

=== Tropical Depression 01W (Amang) ===
- Tropical depression (JMA)
- Tropical depression (SSHWS)
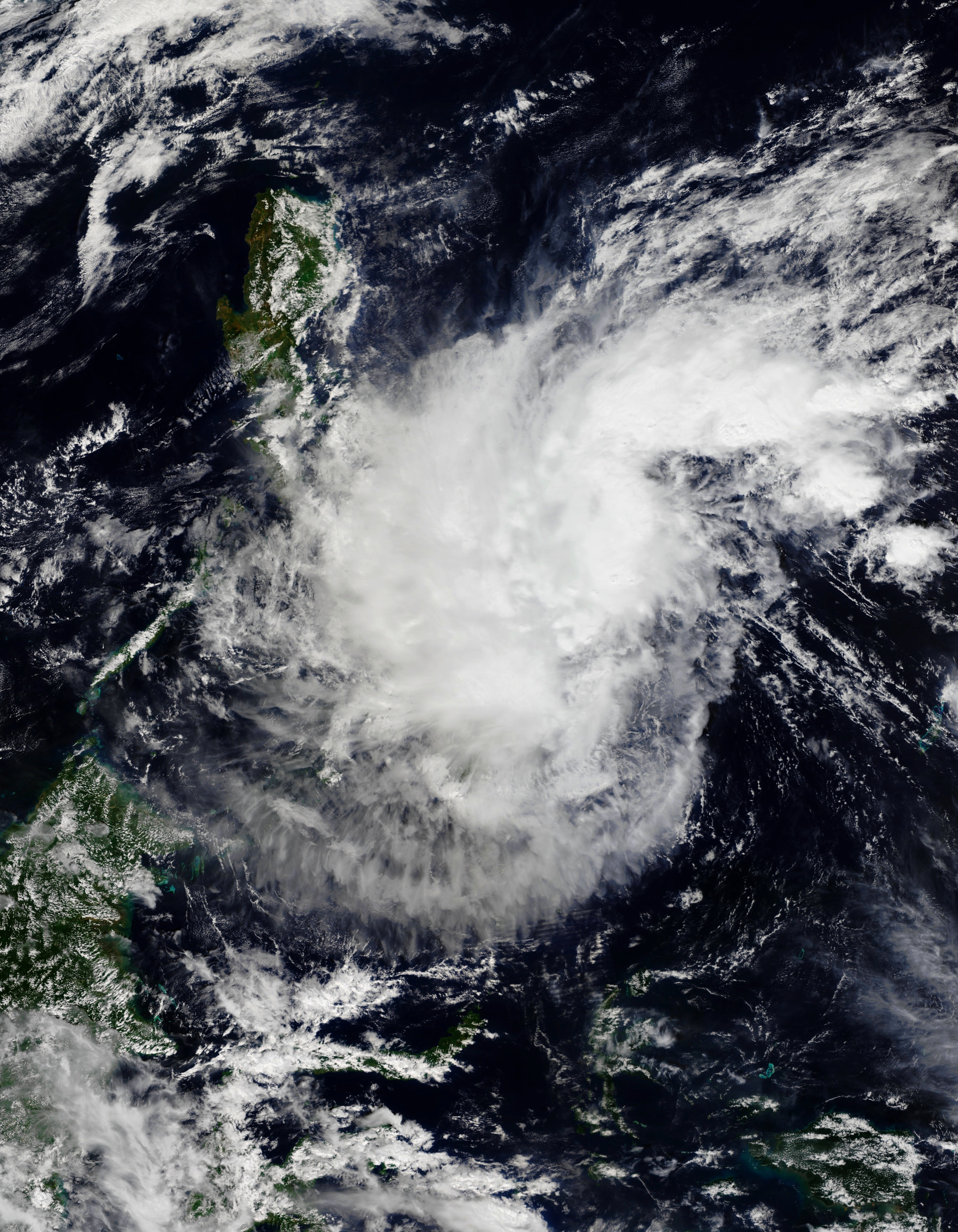
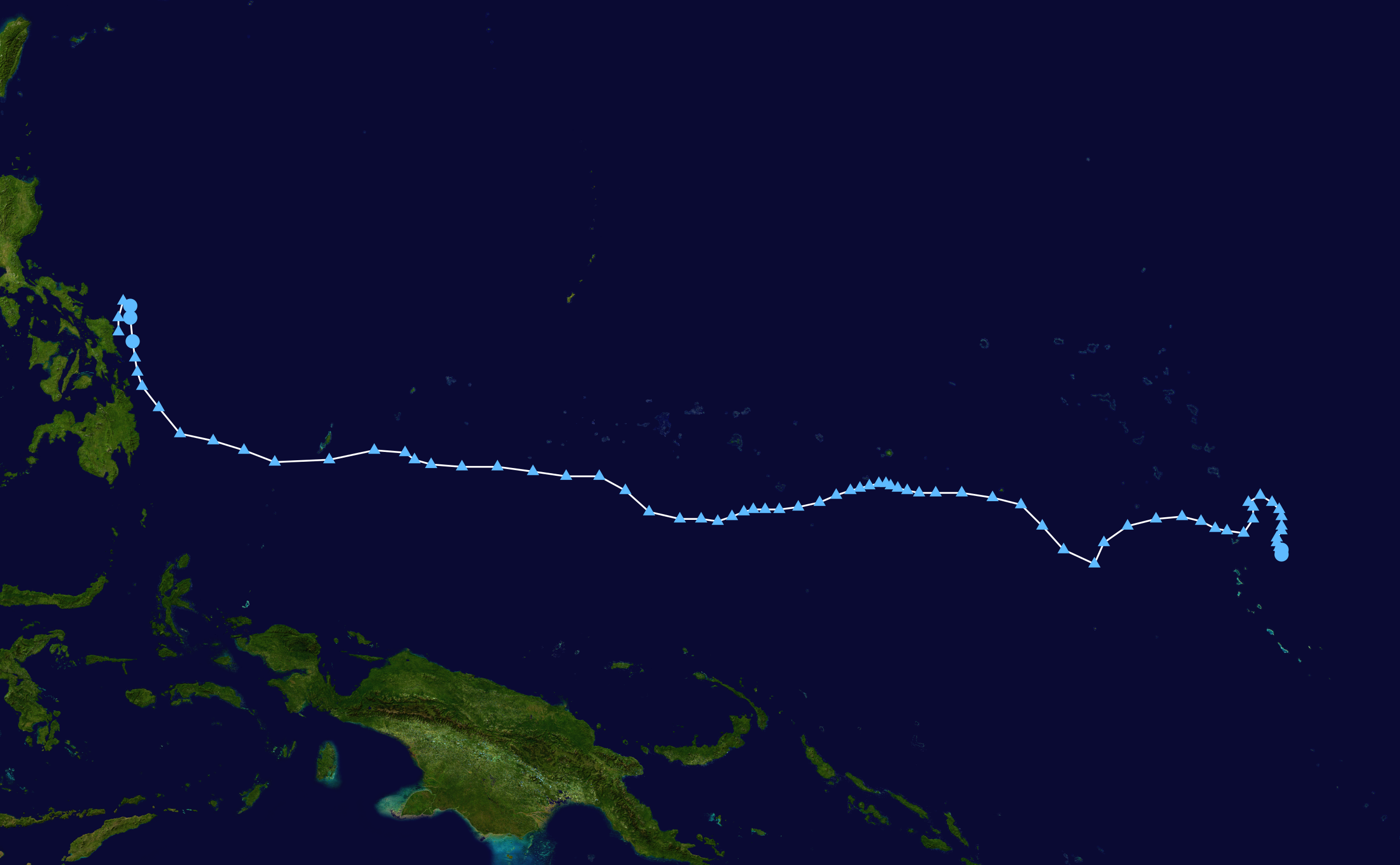
- Duration: January 4 – January 22
- Peak intensity: 55 km/h (35 mph) (10-min); 1004 hPa (mbar)

The JTWC upgraded a disturbance north of Bairiki to a tropical depression with the designation 01W late on January 4 and expected some intensification, but it failed to develop and the JTWC downgraded it back to a disturbance on January 6. The system continued drifting westwards for two weeks without development. On January 19, the JMA upgraded the low-pressure area to a tropical depression when it was already located about 200 km (120 mi) west of Palau. The tropical depression entered the Philippine Area of Responsibility, being given the name Amang by PAGASA. Amang moved west-northwestward until it made landfall over Siargao at 11:00 Philippine Standard Time (PST), January 20. Amang changed course after the landfall, turning northward the next day until weakening over Samar the same day. Amang then weakened into a low pressure area before dissipating shortly afterwards, which then PAGASA issued their final advisories.

The depression indirectly triggered landslides and flash floods in Davao Oriental and Agusan del Norte, killing 10 people. Damage in Davao were at ₱318.99 million (US$6.04 million).

=== Typhoon Wutip (Betty) ===
- Violent typhoon (JMA)
- Category 5 super typhoon (SSHWS)
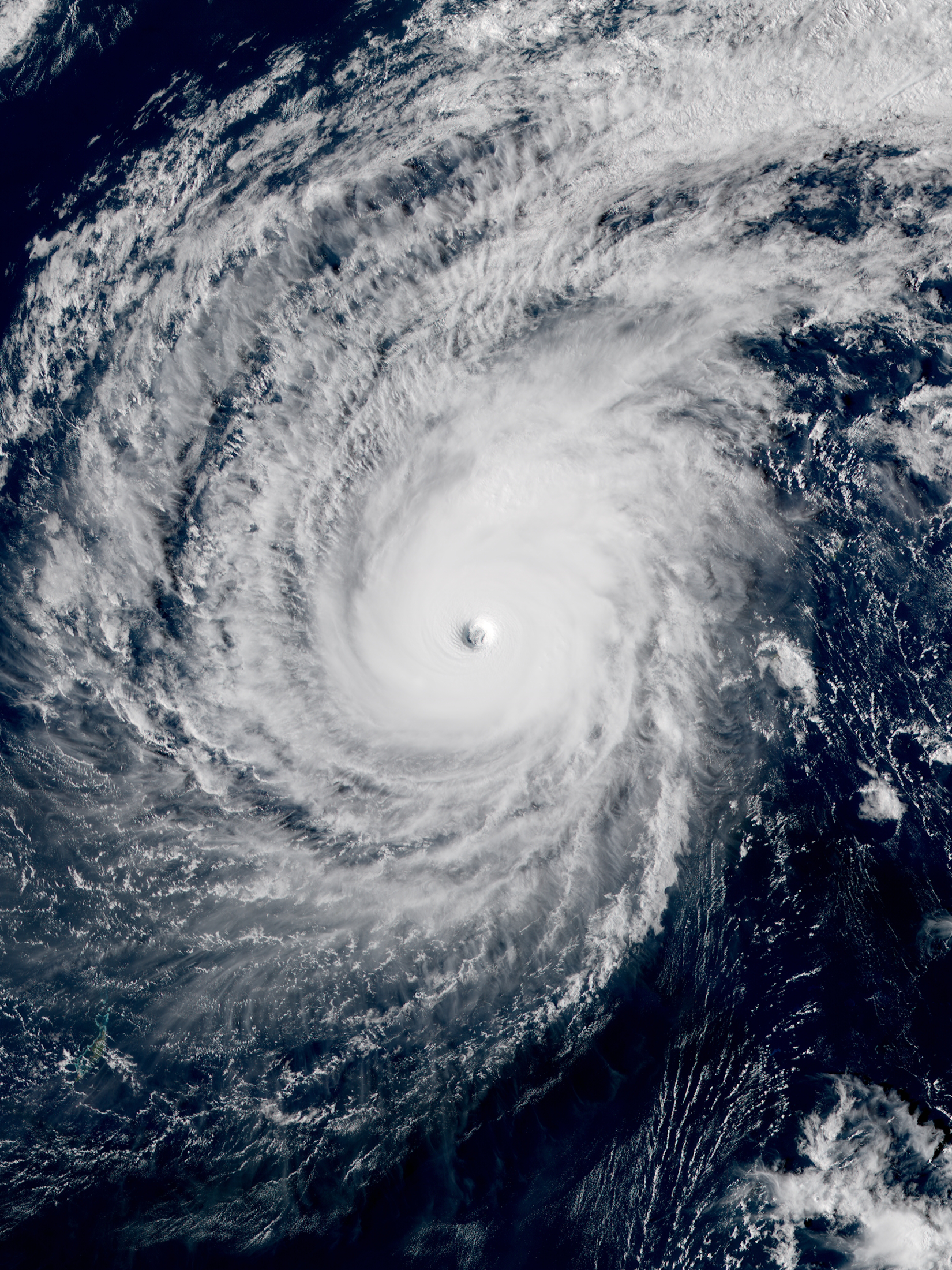
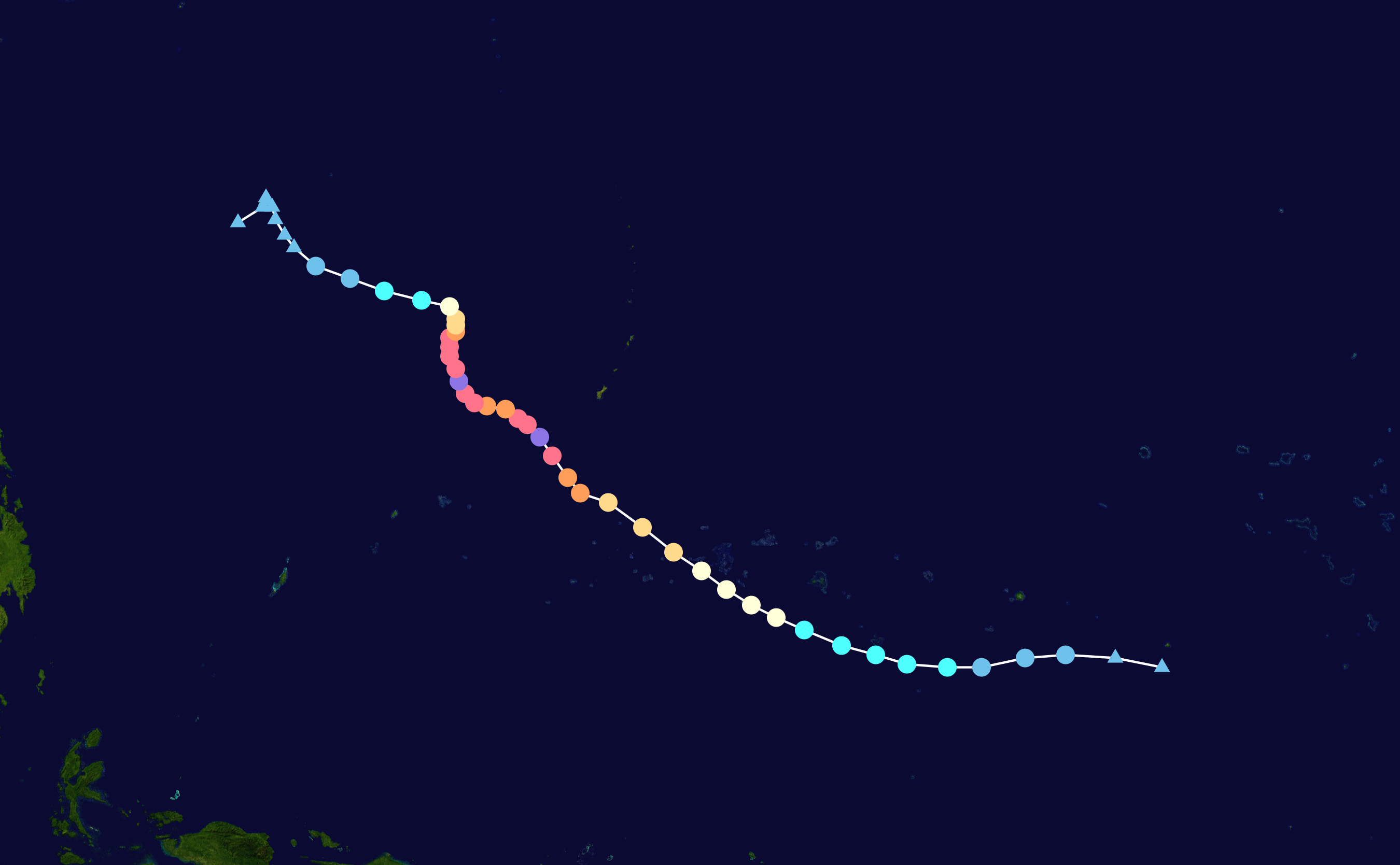
- Duration: February 18 – March 2
- Peak intensity: 195 km/h (120 mph) (10-min); 920 hPa (mbar)

A low-pressure area south of the Federated States of Micronesia intensified into Tropical Depression 02W on February 18. The system was later upgraded to a tropical storm the following day after improving its deep rainbands, earning the name Wutip. On February 20, its convection rapidly deepened, attaining severe tropical storm status from the JMA, before strengthening further into a typhoon the next day. It formed a central dense overcast, and an eye was detected on satellite imagery shortly thereafter on February 22. By the next day, Wutip underwent rapid intensification, reaching 1-minute winds of 270 km/h (165 mph), becoming the most powerful February typhoon on record, surpassing Typhoon Higos of 2015. Shortly afterward, an eyewall replacement cycle occurred, weakening the storm. Upon completion on February 24, Wutip again rapidly intensified into a Category 5-equivalent super typhoon on February 25. Wutip entered a hostile environment with increased wind shear and began to weaken, concurrently making another turn westward. On February 28, Wutip weakened into a tropical depression and lost most of its convection, and was given the name "Betty" by the PAGASA as the storm entered the Philippine Sea. The storm rapidly weakened until it dissipated on March 2.

In Chuuk and Yap States, Wutip produced inundation and powerful winds that destroyed crops and damaged around 160 houses, leaving 165 people homeless. On February 23, as Wutip was approaching Guam, power outages were reported across the island, and heavy damage was dealt to infrastructure, adding to the total of over $3.3 million (2019 USD) in damages. The Northern Mariana Islands received minor impact, and there were no casualties reported in the affected areas nonetheless.

=== Tropical Depression 03W (Chedeng) ===
- Tropical depression (JMA)
- Tropical storm (SSHWS)
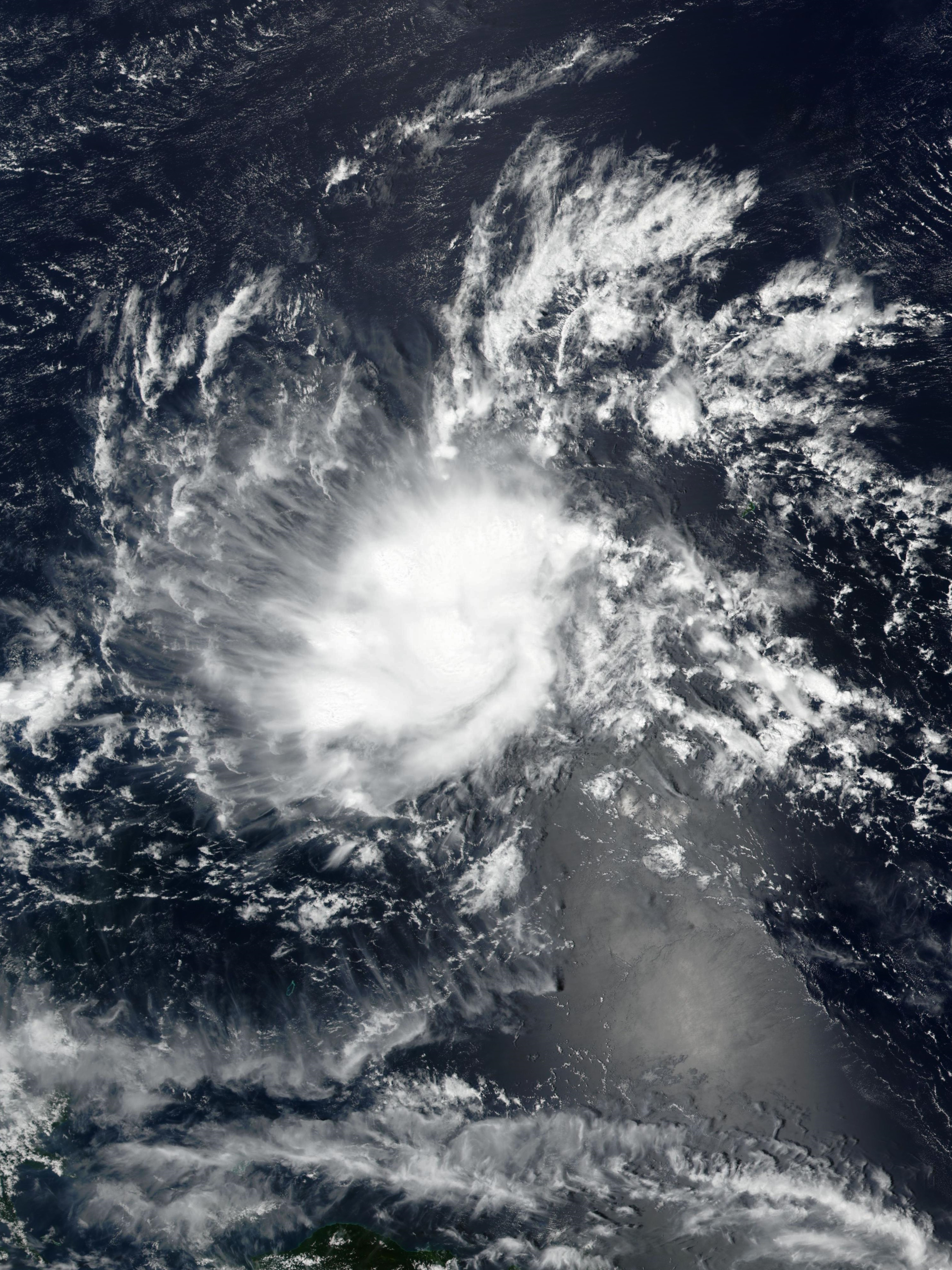
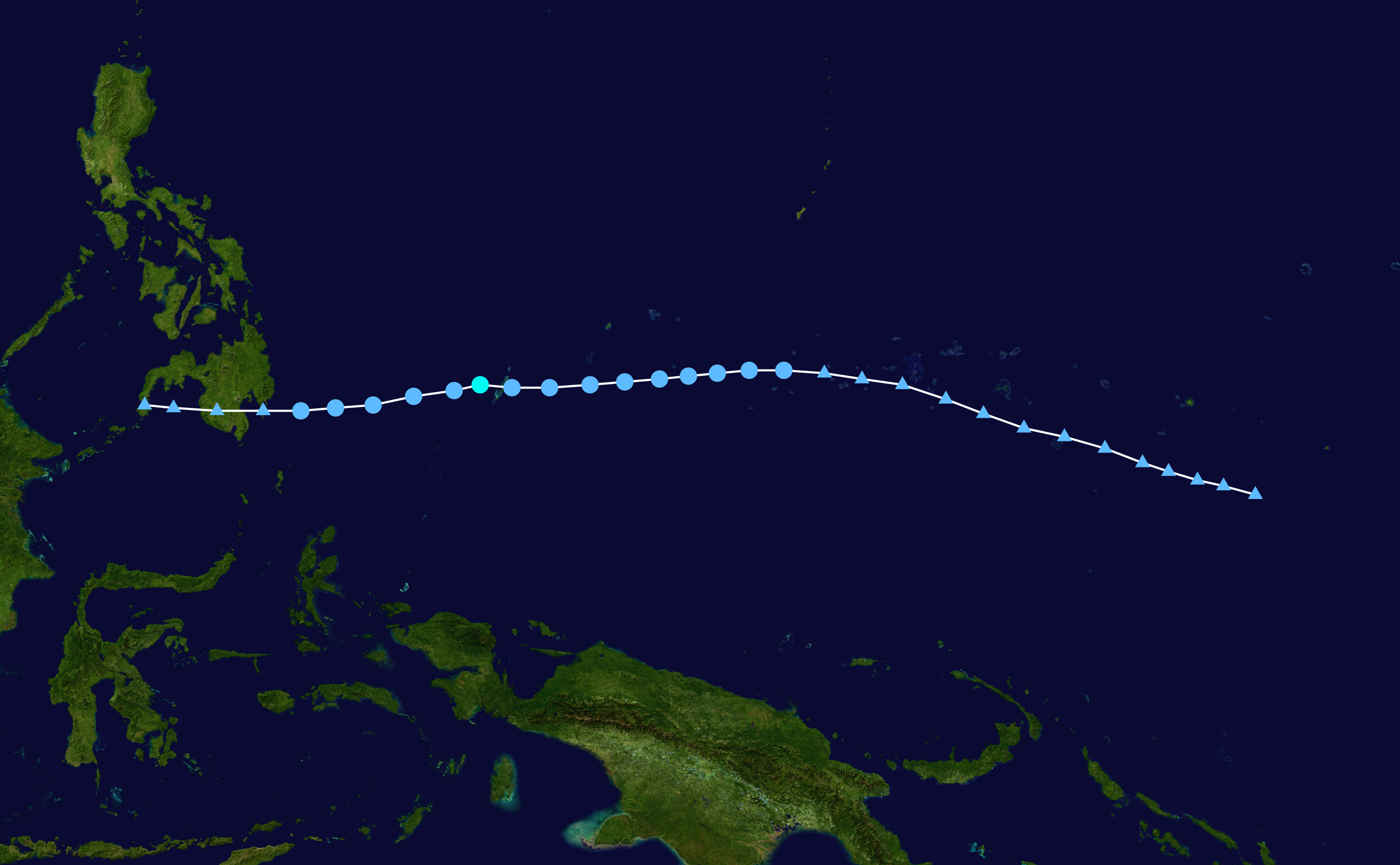
- Duration: March 14 – March 19
- Peak intensity: <55 km/h (35 mph) (10-min); 1006 hPa (mbar)

On March 14, Tropical Depression 03W formed over the Federated States of Micronesia. Over the next couple of days, the system drifted westward, while gradually organizing. Early on March 17, the tropical depression entered the PAGASA's area of responsibility in the Philippine Sea, and consequently, the agency assigned the name Chedeng to the storm, shortly before it made landfall on Palau. A few hours after the landfall in Palau, Chedeng intensified into a tropical storm; operationally, Chedeng maintained only tropical depression status by the JTWC. It then weakened due to unfavorable conditions and at 5:30 PST on March 19, Chedeng made landfall on Malita, Davao Occidental. Chedeng rapidly weakened after making landfall in the Philippines, degenerating into a remnant low on March 19. Chedeng's remnants continued weakening while moving westward, dissipating over the southern Sulu Sea on March 20.

Infrastructural damage in Davao Region were at Php1.2 million (US$23,000).

=== Tropical Storm Sepat (Dodong) ===
- Tropical storm (JMA)
- Subtropical storm (SSHWS)
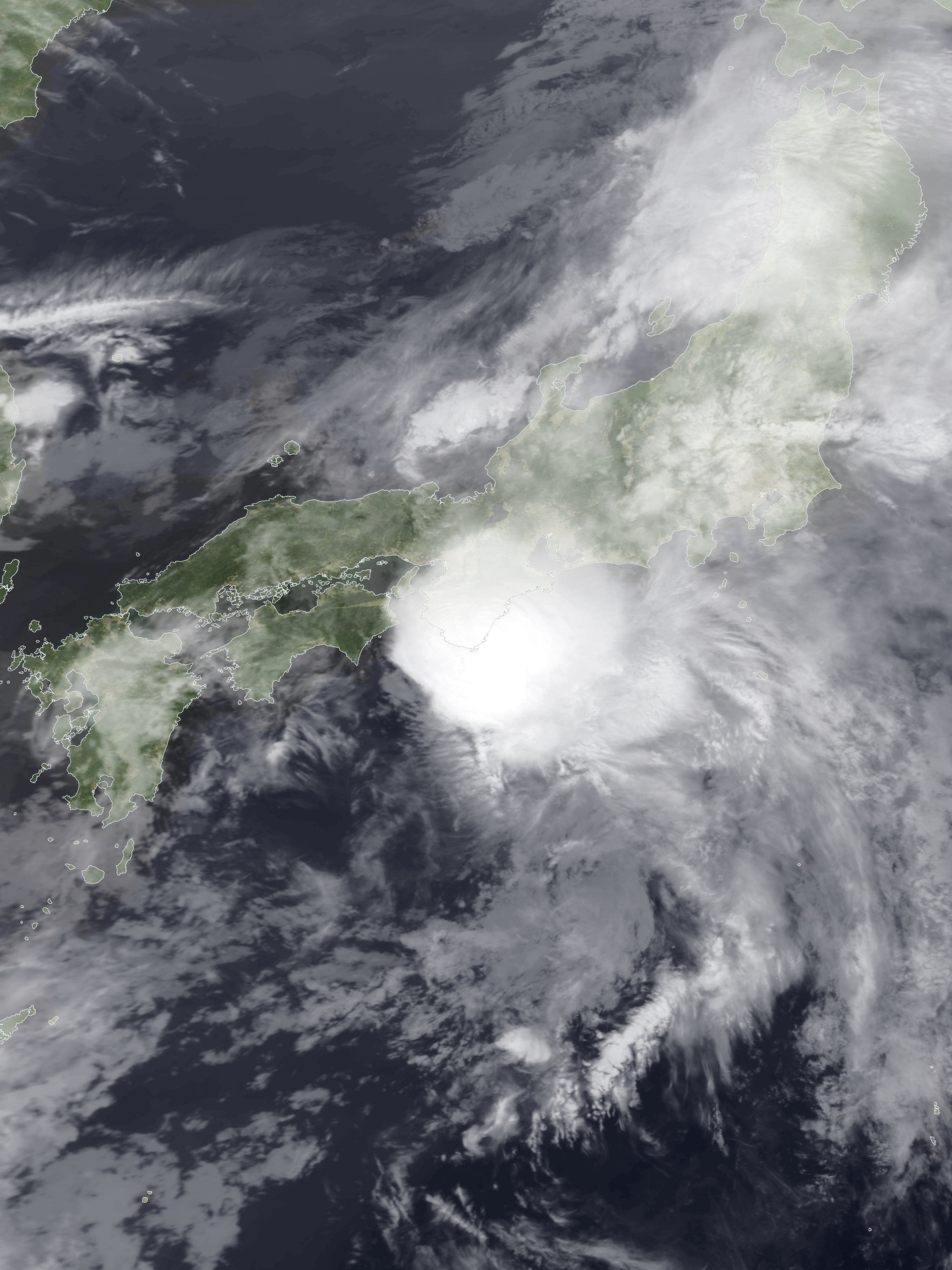
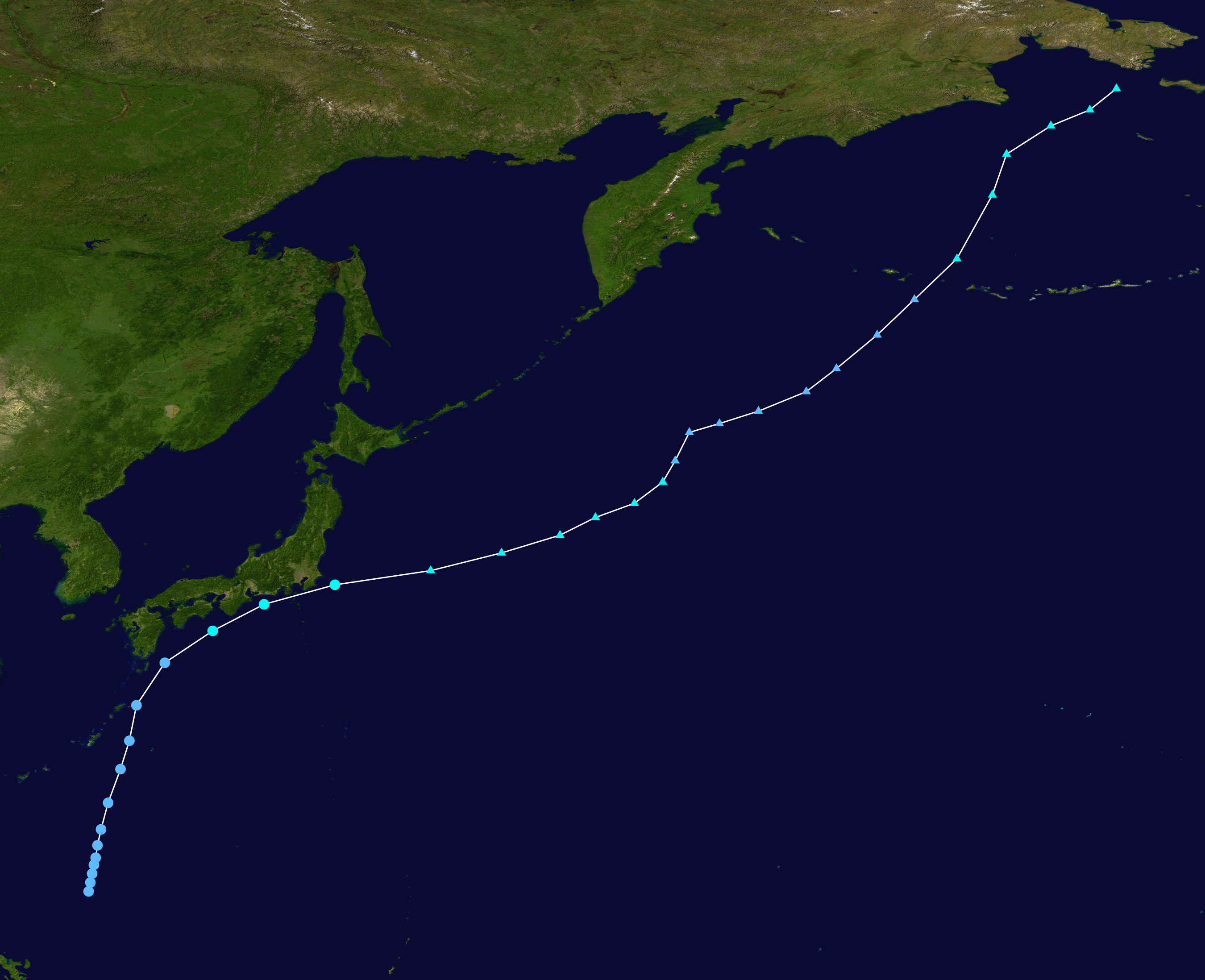
- Duration: June 24 – June 28
- Peak intensity: 75 km/h (45 mph) (10-min); 994 hPa (mbar)

On June 24, the JMA began monitoring on a tropical depression that had formed well to the east of Luzon from the remnants of a separate system. On June 25, the system began curving towards the northeast; the PAGASA also began to issue warnings on the formative disturbance. Rounding the periphery of a subtropical ridge of high pressure, the depression tracked towards the east-northeast through the East China Sea, intensifying some as it encountered an area of high sea surface temperatures and low wind shear. On June 26, the cyclone left the PAGASA's area of responsibility. Curved banding developed later that day as the center passed east of Okinawa. Tracing the northwestern periphery of the ridge, the system curved towards the east-northeast, paralleling the southern coast of the main Japanese islands. Supported by favorable sea surface temperatures and outflow, the system was upgraded to a tropical storm at 09:00 UTC on June 27, gaining the name Sepat. A peak intensity with 75 km/h (47 mph) 10-minute sustained winds was attained later that day while Sepat began to acquire extratropical characteristics. The next day, the storm fully transitioned into an extratropical system while accelerating eastward 580 km (360 mi) east of Hitachinaka, Japan. Sepat's extratropical remnants continued accelerating towards the northeast, moving into the western Bering Sea on July 1, before eventually dissipating over the Arctic Ocean early on July 5.

This system was not tracked by the JTWC; however, the agency classified the system as a subtropical storm, with 1-minute sustained winds at 75 km/h (47 mph). Some ferry routes and bullet trains were suspended as the storm passed near Tokyo on June 28, dropping heavy rainfall. Evacuations were advised for most districts in Kagoshima due to an increased risk of landslides. In Hioki, Kagoshima, 164 mm (6.5 in) of rain fell in a six-hour period on the morning of June 28; 240 mm (9.4 in) fell in Kamikatsu, Tokushima, in a 24-hour period. An EF0 tornado damaged 17 structures in Gifu and Ginan.

=== Tropical Depression 04W (Egay) ===
- Tropical depression (JMA)
- Tropical storm (SSHWS)
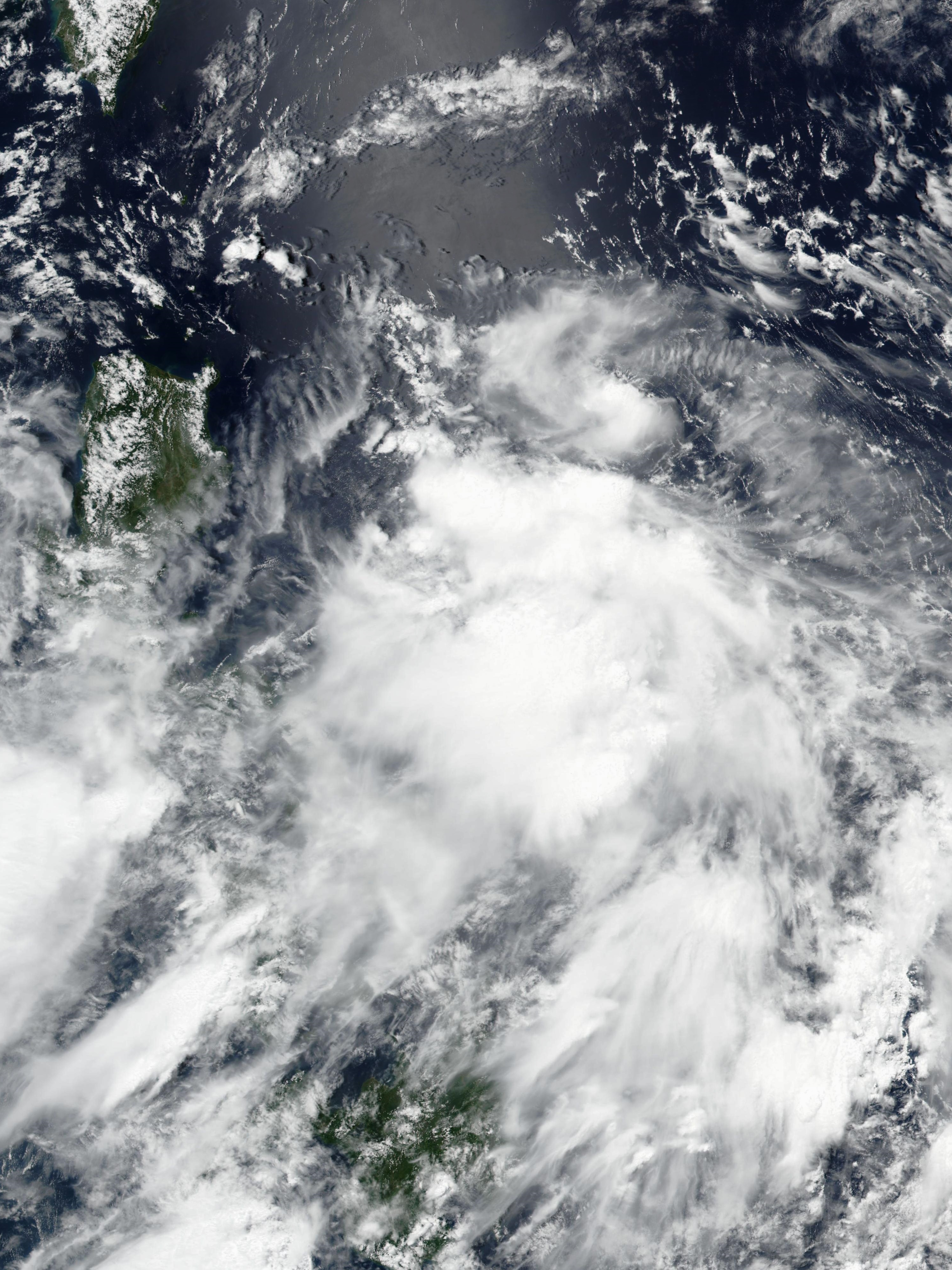
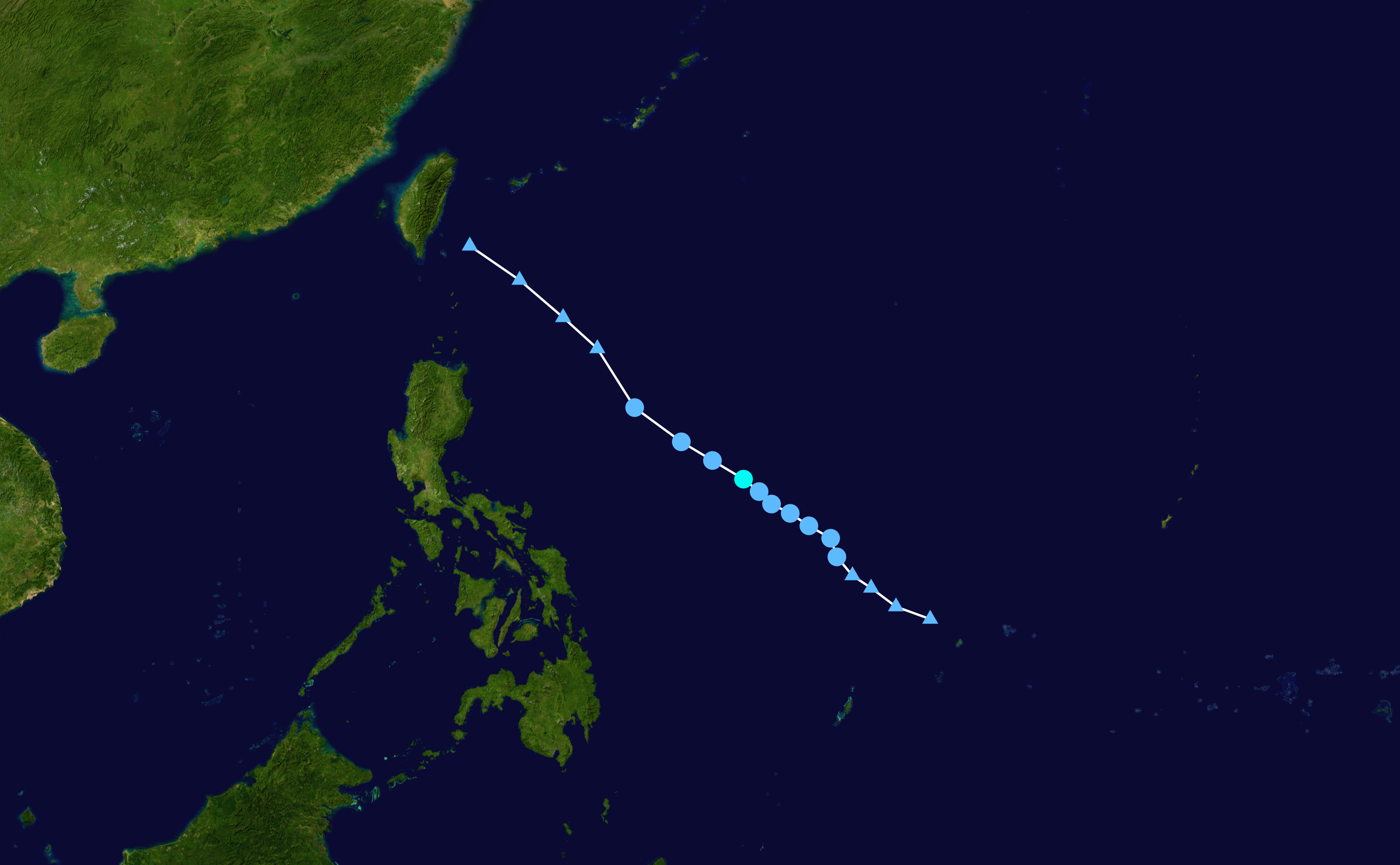
- Duration: June 27 – July 1
- Peak intensity: <55 km/h (35 mph) (10-min); 1002 hPa (mbar)

On June 27, another tropical disturbance formed along a monsoon trough. Later that day, it was recognized as a tropical depression by the JMA, located near Yap. The next day, the JTWC would release a TCFA on what was then-Invest 95W. Following this, the PAGASA would also issue bulletins on this depression, which was locally known as 'Egay'. On 21:00 UTC of the same day, the JTWC would then follow suit to upgrade Invest 95W into a tropical depression and designate it as '04W'. Generally moving northwestward, 04W would then intensify into a tropical storm, however, the JMA and the PAGASA remained Egay as a tropical depression. Egay gradually weakened and was last noted as a tropical depression on July 1 east of Taiwan.

Signal No. 1 warnings were hoisted at some areas in Extreme Northern Luzon as Egay neared the area. Despite it not directly affecting land, it enhanced the southwest monsoon, causing light to moderate rains at some parts of the Philippines.

=== Tropical Storm Mun ===
- Tropical storm (JMA)
- Tropical storm (SSHWS)
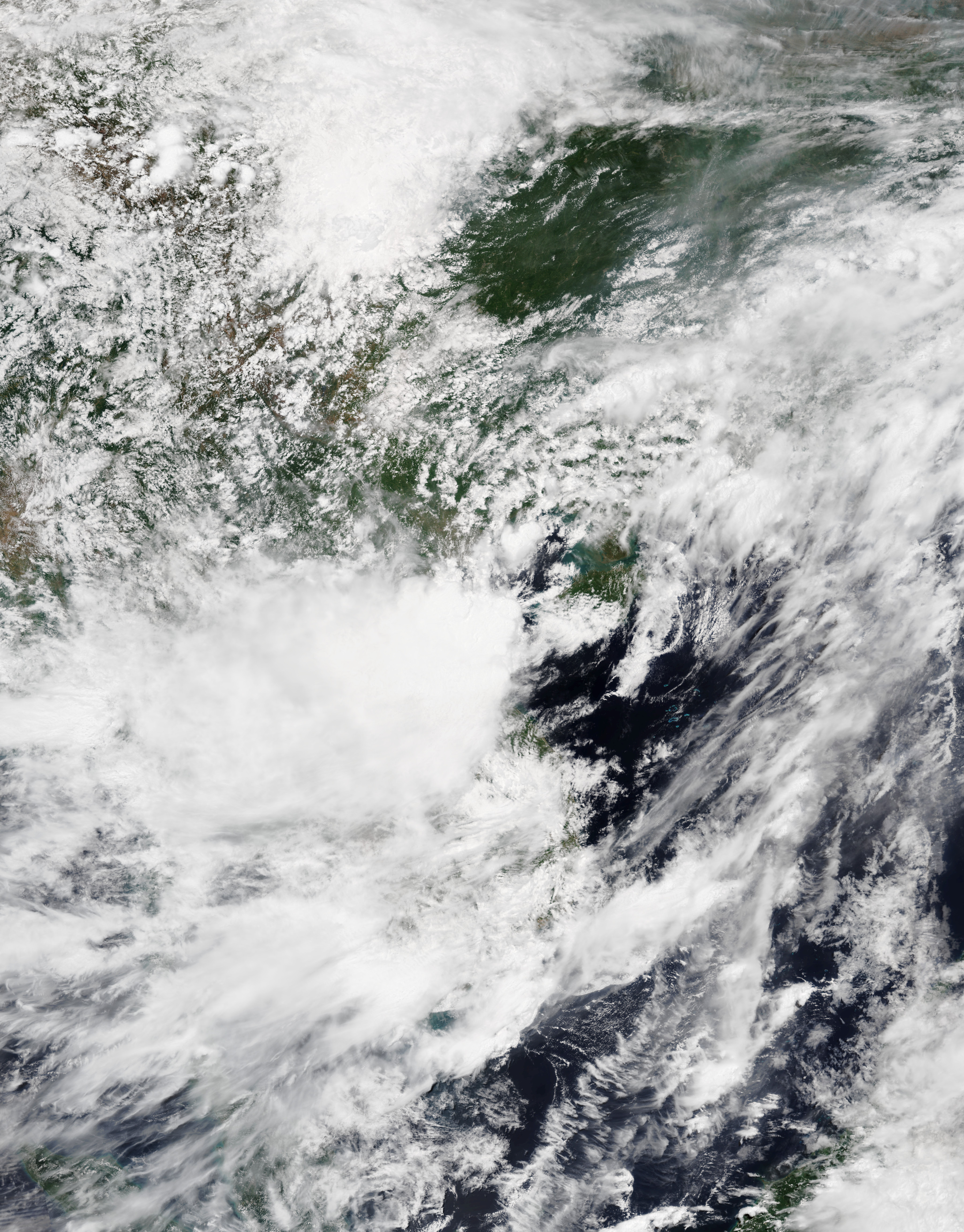
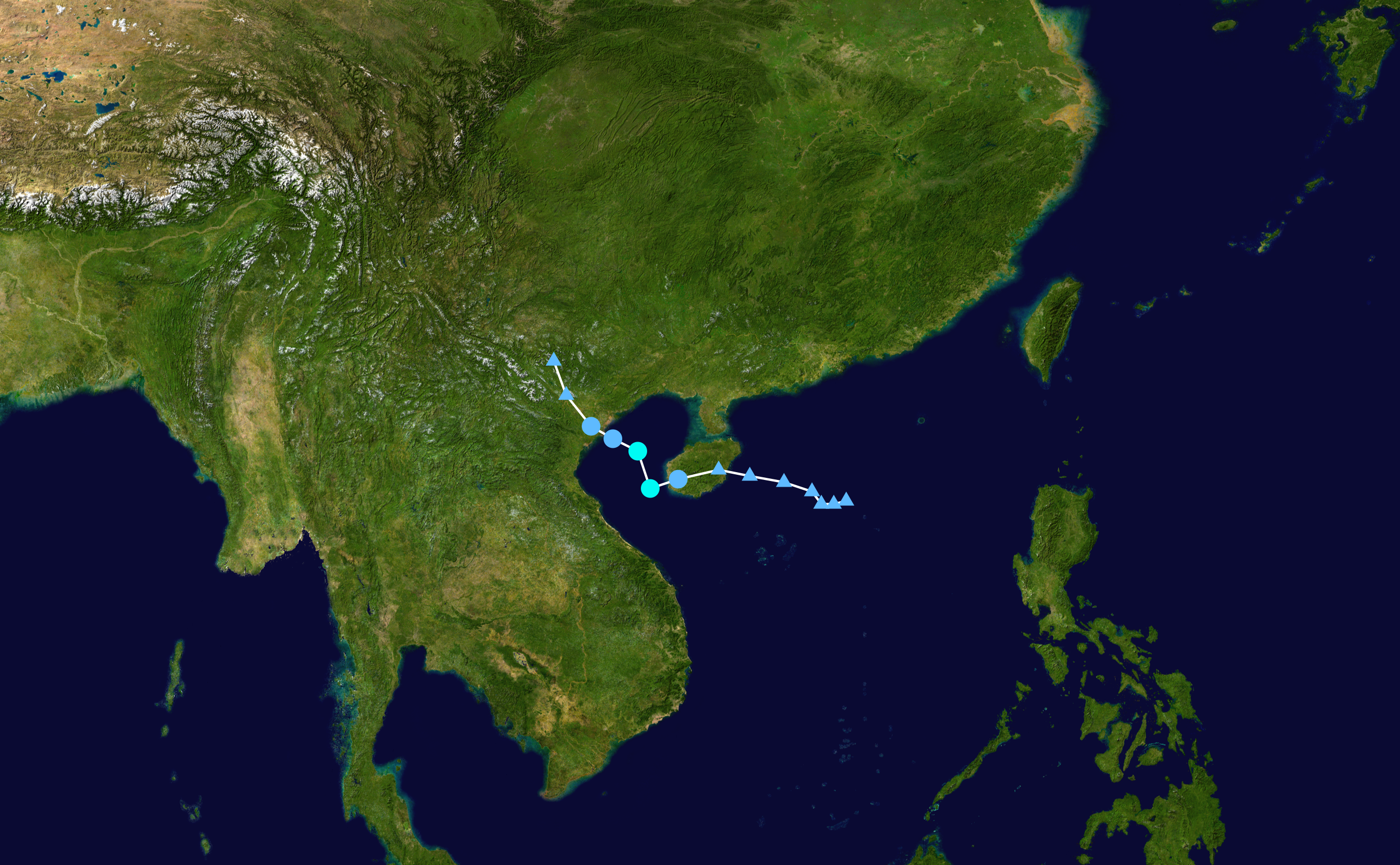
- Duration: July 1 – July 4
- Peak intensity: 65 km/h (40 mph) (10-min); 992 hPa (mbar)

On July 1, an area of low pressure organized into a tropical depression formed in the South China Sea, near Hainan and the Paracel Islands. The system gradually organized while drifting eastward. On the next day, the tropical depression strengthened into a tropical storm, and the JMA named the storm Mun. Later that day, Tropical Storm Mun made landfall on the island of Hainan. However, the JTWC still recognized Mun as a monsoon depression and didn't upgrade it into a tropical cyclone for another day. Late on July 3, after the storm had nearly crossed the Gulf of Tonkin to the coast of Vietnam, the JTWC upgraded the storm to tropical storm status and initiated advisories on the system, stating that Mun had organized enough to be considered a tropical cyclone. Between 4:30–5:00 a.m. ICT on July 4 (21:30–22:00 UTC on July 3), Mun made landfall in Thái Bình Province in northern Vietnam. Afterward, Mun moved inland while weakening, before dissipating late on July 4.

A bridge in Tĩnh Gia District was damaged by the storm, which killed 2 people and left 3 injured. Damage of an electric pole in Trấn Yên District were at ₫5.6 billion (US$240,000).

=== Tropical Storm Danas (Falcon) ===
- Tropical storm (JMA)
- Tropical storm (SSHWS)
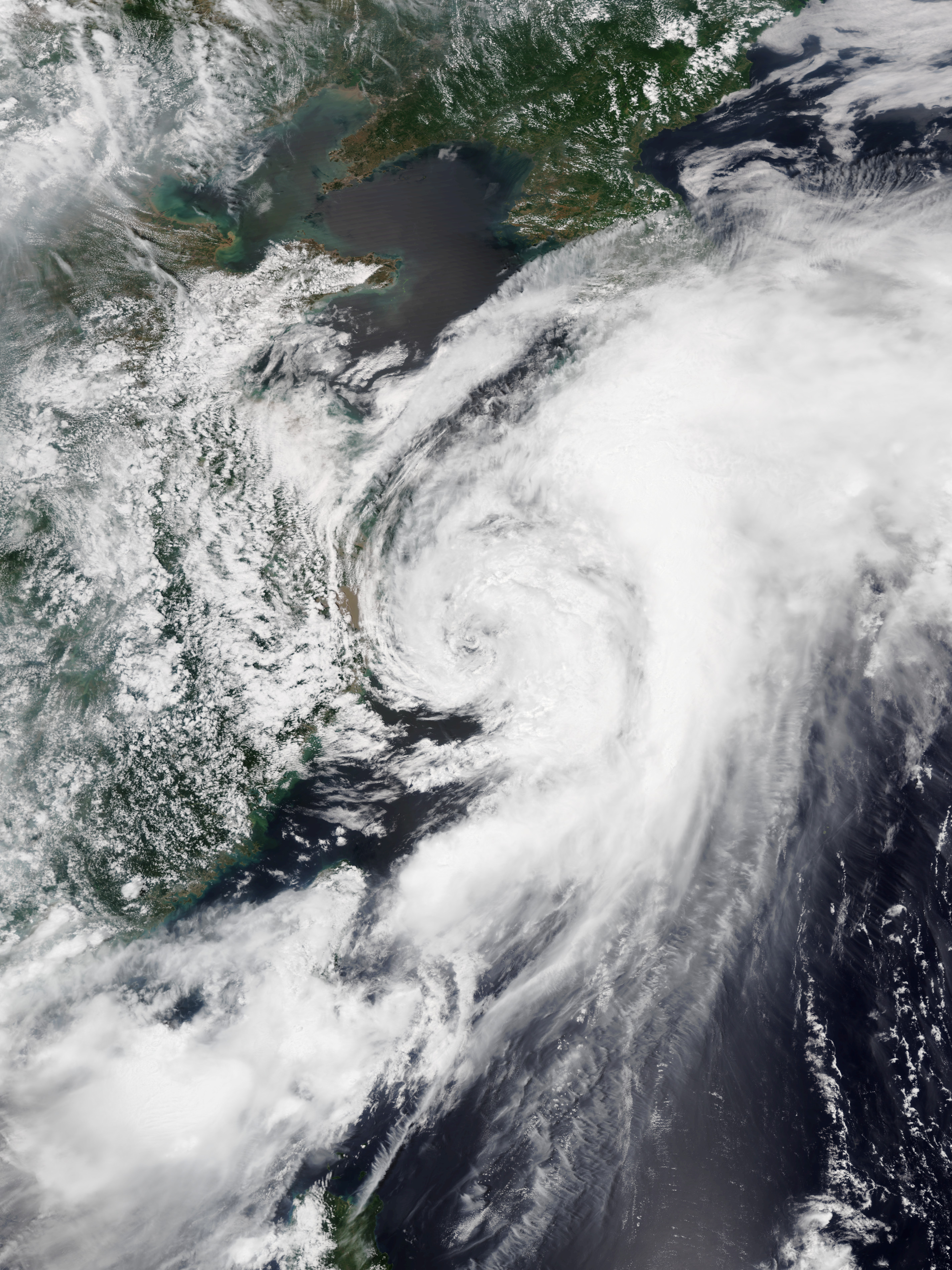
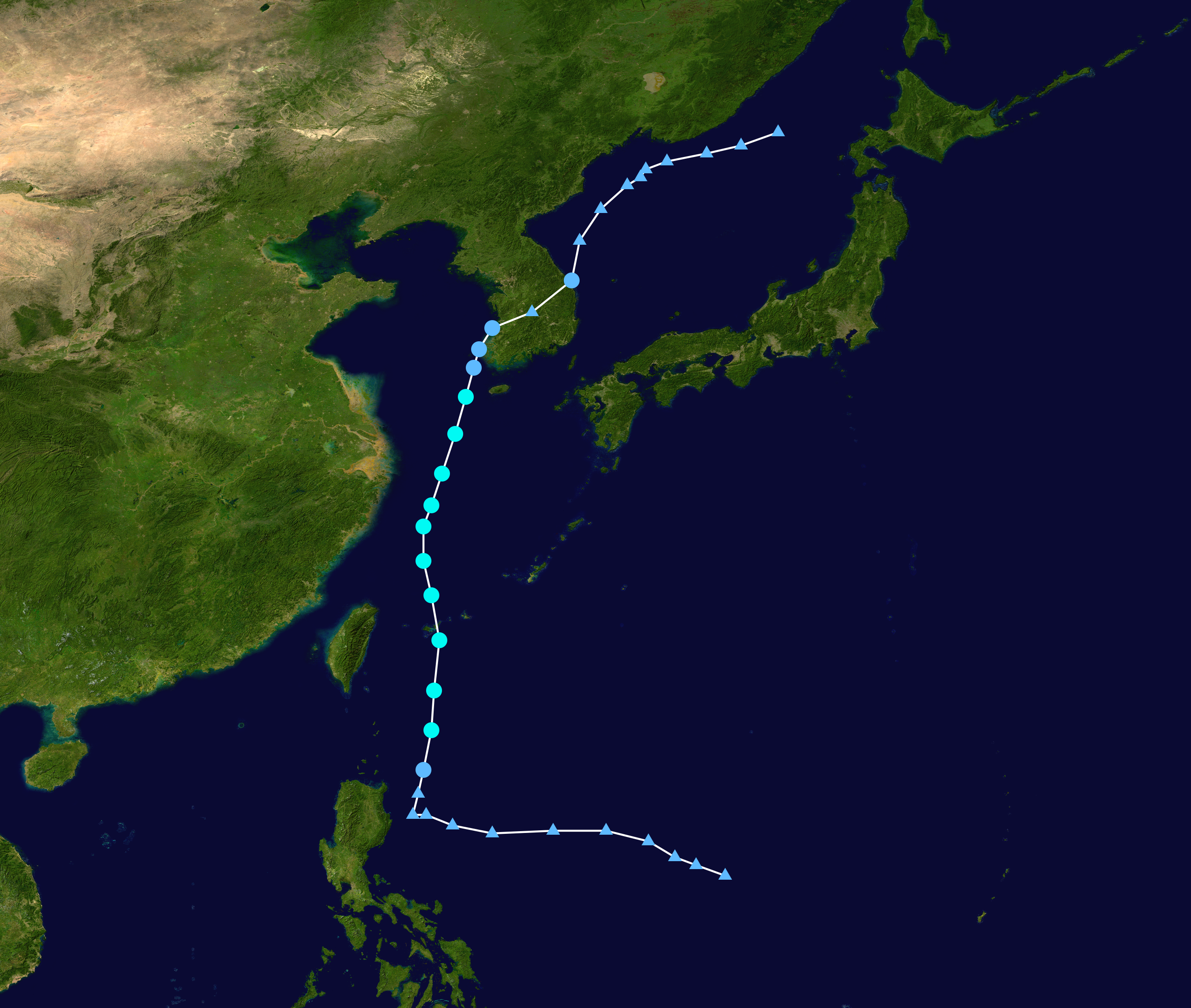
- Duration: July 14 – July 21
- Peak intensity: 85 km/h (50 mph) (10-min); 985 hPa (mbar)

On July 12, an area of low pressure formed near the Mariana Islands. During the next couple of days, the system slowly drifted westward while gradually organizing. Early on July 14, the low-pressure area organized into a tropical depression to the southwest of the Mariana Islands. Later that day, the tropical depression entered the Philippine area of responsibility, and the PAGASA gave the system the name Falcon. Afterward, the system continued organizing while approaching Luzon. On July 16, the tropical depression strengthened into a tropical storm, and the JMA named the system Danas. Shortly afterward, at 12:00 UTC that day, the JTWC upgraded Danas to a tropical storm.

At 12:30 a.m. on July 17 (PST), PAGASA reported that Danas (Falcon) had made landfall at Gattaran, Cagayan and looped over the landmass. However, after post-analysis, Danas's center of circulation didn't made landfall. Northeasterly wind shear had displaced much of Danas' convection to the west, and an area of low pressure had formed to the east of Luzon. This led to the formation of another area of low pressure over the western Philippines. This low would later develop into Tropical Depression Goring. On July 19, the JMA reported that Danas has reached its peak intensity with winds of 85 km/h (53 mph). Later that day, Danas began to weaken. On July 20, around 13:00 UTC, Danas made landfall on North Jeolla Province, South Korea, before weakening into a tropical depression soon afterward. At 12:45 UTC on July 21, Danas transitioned into an extratropical low in the Sea of Japan, and the JMA issued their final advisory on the storm.

In Philippines, four people were killed after Danas triggered flooding in the country. Agricultural damage in Negros Occidental were calculated at ₱19 million (US$372,000), while agricultural damage in Lanao Norte reached ₱277.8 million (US$5.44 million). Danas caused stormy weather across South Korea; however, its effects were relatively minor. Heavy rains amounted to 329.5 mm (12.97 in) in Geomun-do. A man died after being swept away by strong waves in Geochang County. Damage in South Jeolla Province were at W395 million (US$336,000), while damage in Jeju Island up to W322 million (US$274,000). Additionally, Danas also triggered flash flooding in Kyushu. An 11-year-old boy was killed.

=== Tropical Depression Goring ===
- Tropical depression (JMA)
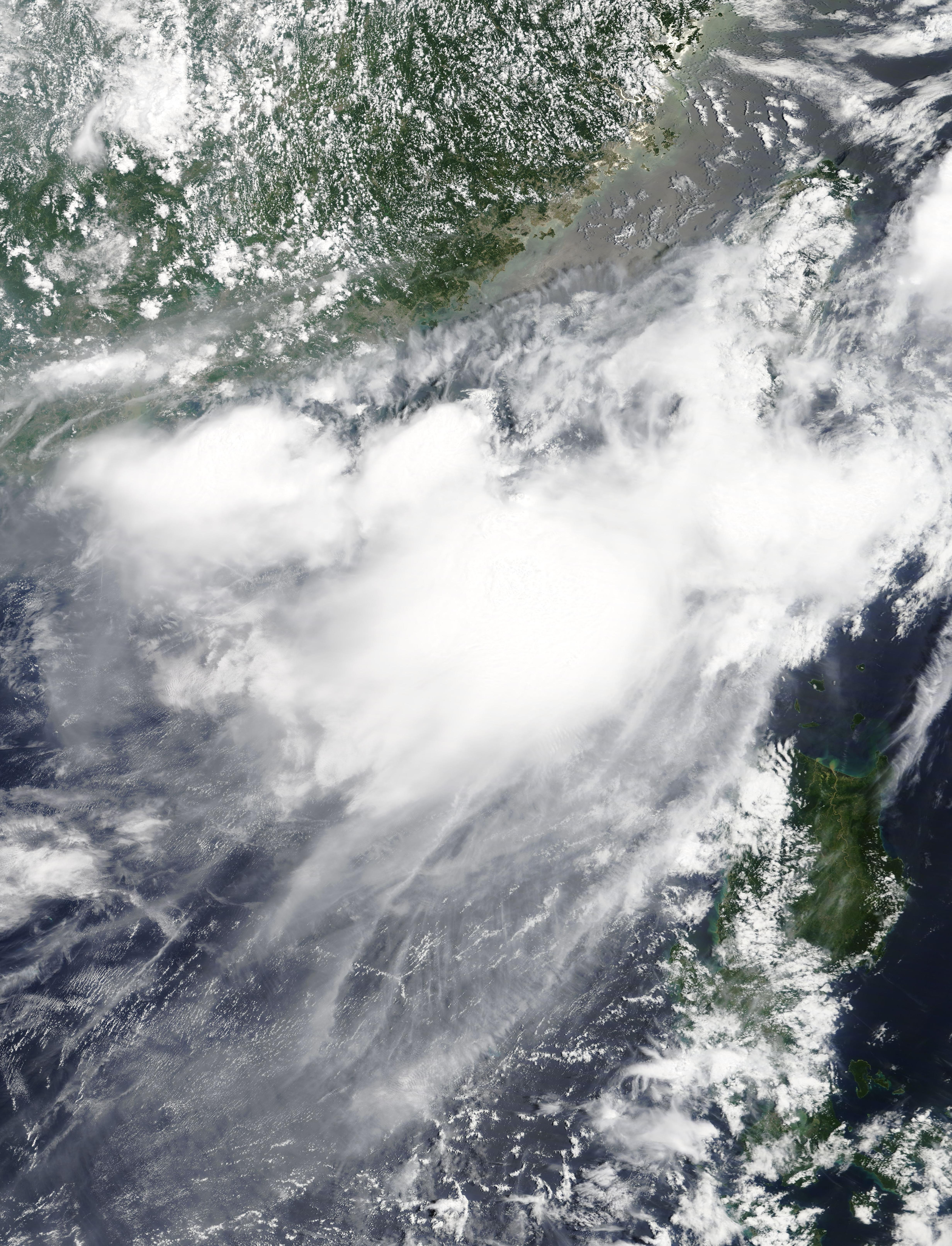
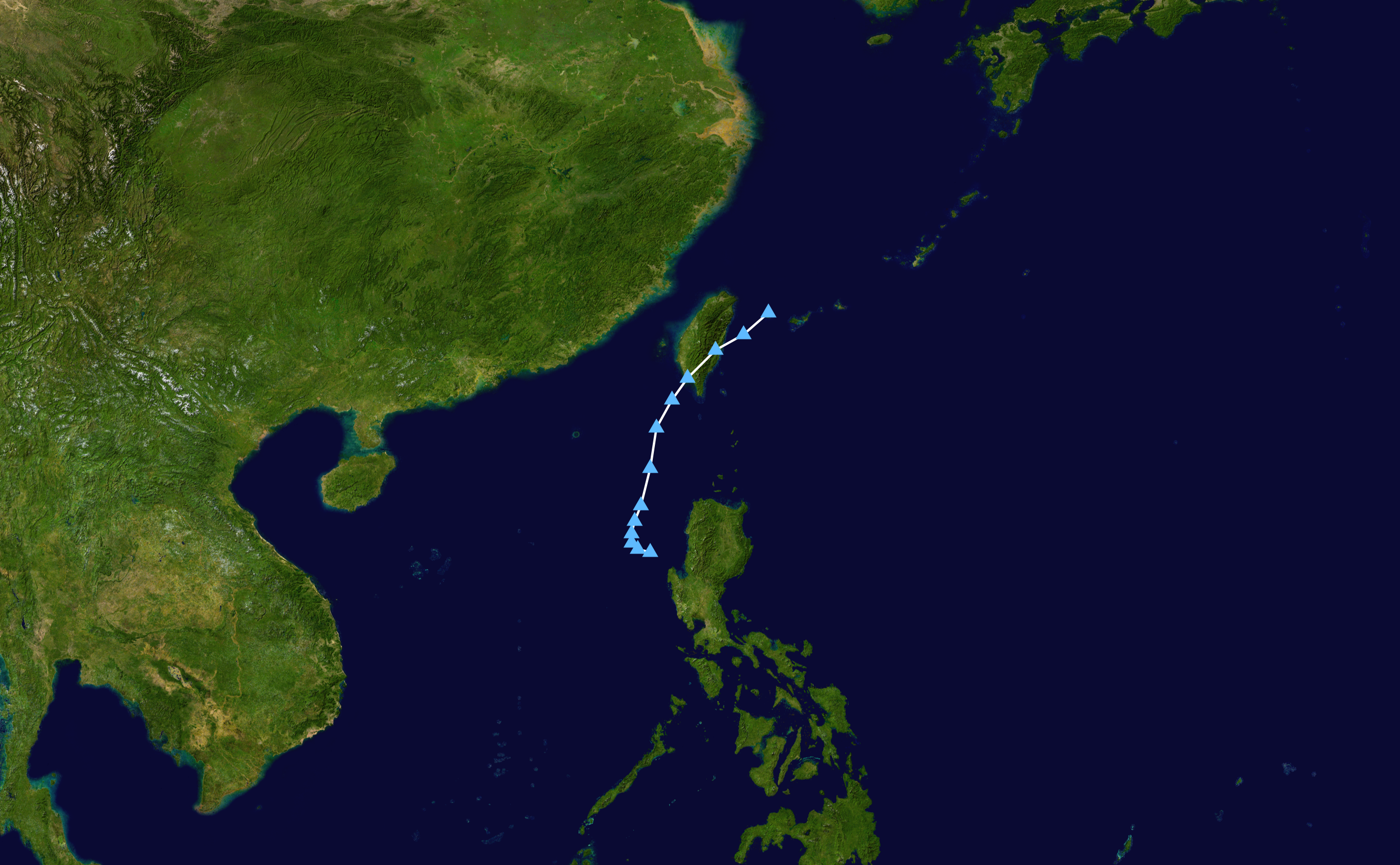
- Duration: July 17 – July 19
- Peak intensity: 55 km/h (35 mph) (10-min); 996 hPa (mbar)

On July 17, a tropical depression formed from the western part of Tropical Storm Danas after it was battered by northeast wind shear, over the eastern part of the South China Sea, just off the coast of Luzon. Over the next couple of days, the system moved northeastward, and re-entered the PAGASA's Philippine Area of Responsibility, and was named Goring while the JTWC issued a Tropical Cyclone Formation Alert (TCFA) on Goring. Goring reached southern Taiwan early on July 19. However, the storm made landfall on Taiwan soon afterward and weakened; as a result, the JTWC cancelled the TCFA and has lowered Goring's chance for development to 'medium'. Goring dissipated by 18:00 UTC on July 19 (July 20 PST), with PAGASA declaring that Goring had degenerated into a low-pressure area and discontinued advisories on the storm, and the JMA ceased advisories as well. The remnants of Goring was then merged with a new low pressure system which would eventually become a Tropical Storm Nari. Goring's outflow was then re-absorbed by Danas.

=== Tropical Storm Nari ===
- Tropical storm (JMA)
- Tropical storm (SSHWS)
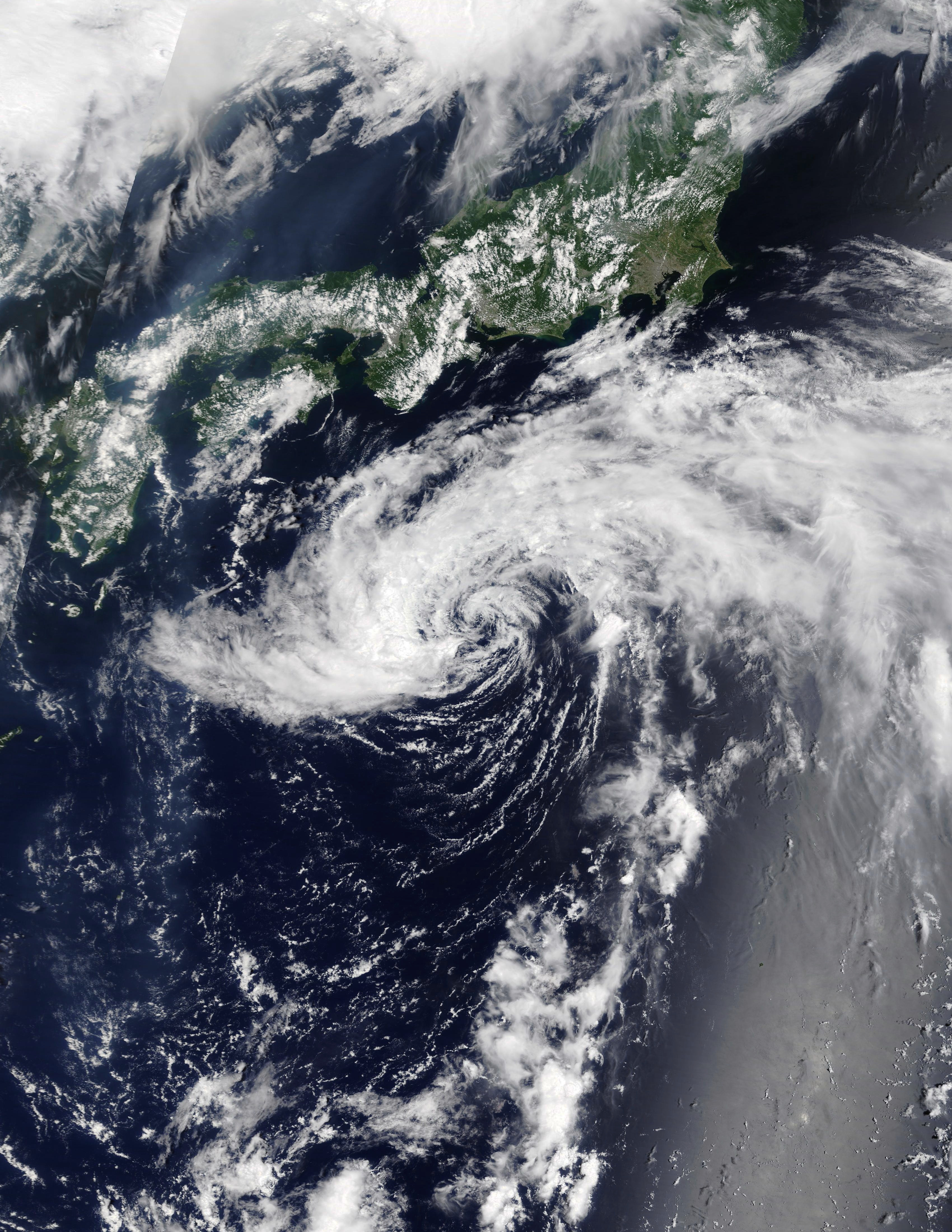
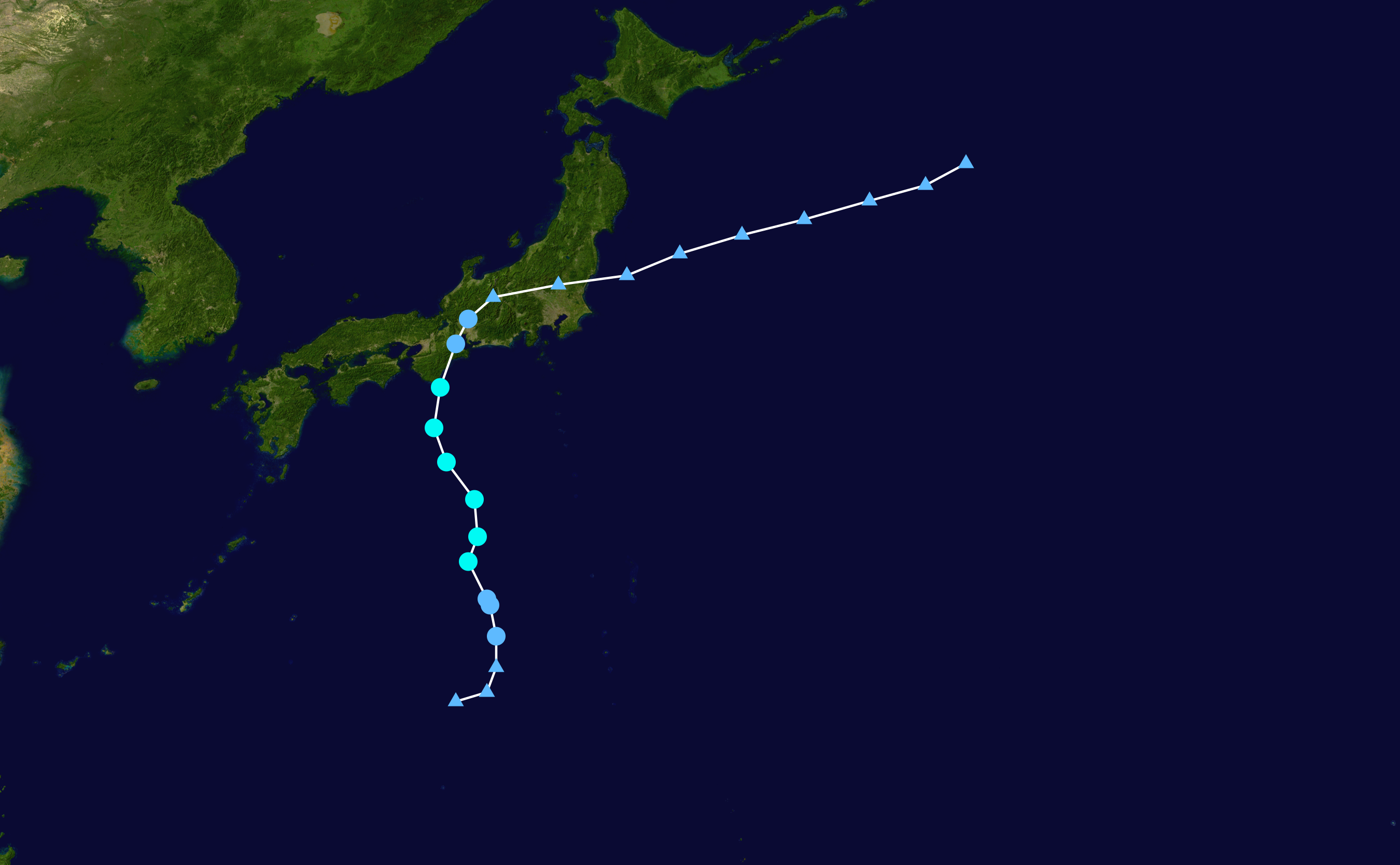
- Duration: July 24 – July 27
- Peak intensity: 65 km/h (40 mph) (10-min); 998 hPa (mbar)

On July 21, the JTWC started tracking an area of low pressure associated with remnant of Tropical Depression Goring for the potential formation of a tropical cyclone. Under favorable conditions, the system organized itself in the next several days. At 00:00 UTC on July 24, it developed into a tropical depression to the west of the Bonin Islands. The storm gradually became more organized while moving north-northwestward. Early on July 25, the JTWC initiated advisories on the storm and gave it the identification "07W". Early on July 26, the tropical depression strengthened into a tropical storm, and the JMA named it Nari while it moved northwards. The storm approached southern Japan and as it moved inland, it weakened into a tropical depression. Several hours later, it degenerated into a remnant low. Thus, the JTWC and JMA issued their final advisories on the system.

=== Tropical Storm Wipha ===
- Tropical storm (JMA)
- Tropical storm (SSHWS)
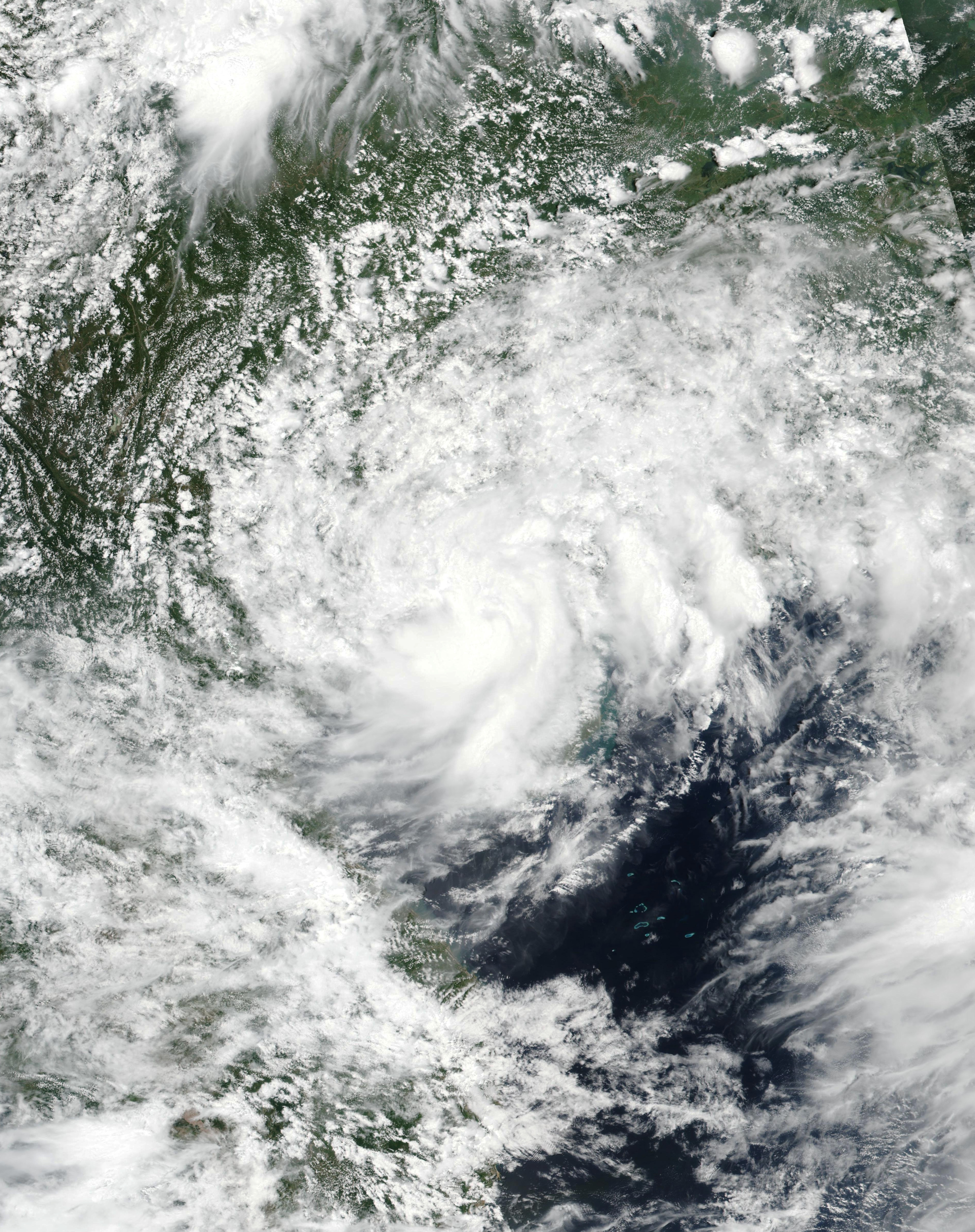
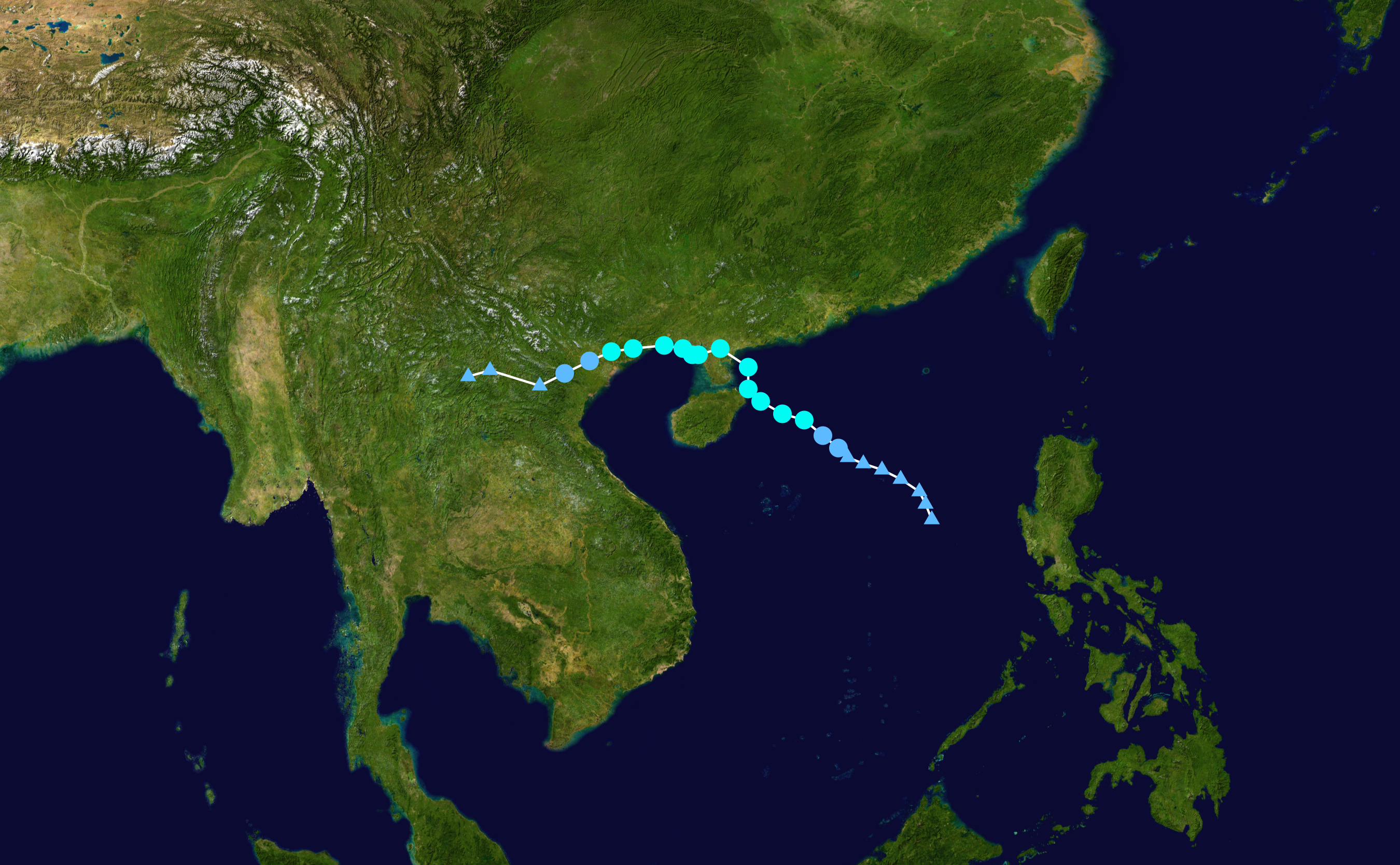
- Duration: July 30 – August 4
- Peak intensity: 85 km/h (50 mph) (10-min); 985 hPa (mbar)

On July 30, a tropical depression formed in the South China Sea near the Paracel Islands and Hainan. On the next day, it strengthened into a tropical storm, and the JMA named it Wipha. By July 31, the JTWC upgraded Wipha to a tropical storm, with Wipha making landfall on Hainan Island at peak intensity. On August 3, Wipha weakened to a tropical depression after it made landfall in the northern area of Quảng Ninh Province, delivering drenching rains and strong gusts to northern and north-central localities. On August 4, Wipha dissipated at 12:00 UTC.

In Vietnam, at least 27 people were killed. Thanh Hóa Province was the worst hit province within the nation, with 16 deaths alone, and the losses were amounted to 1 trillion đồng (US$43.1 million). Damage in Sơn La Province reached 28 billion đồng (US$1.21 million). Damage in Hainan and Guangxi valued at ¥83.6 million (US$12 million).

=== Typhoon Francisco ===
- Typhoon (JMA)
- Category 1 typhoon (SSHWS)
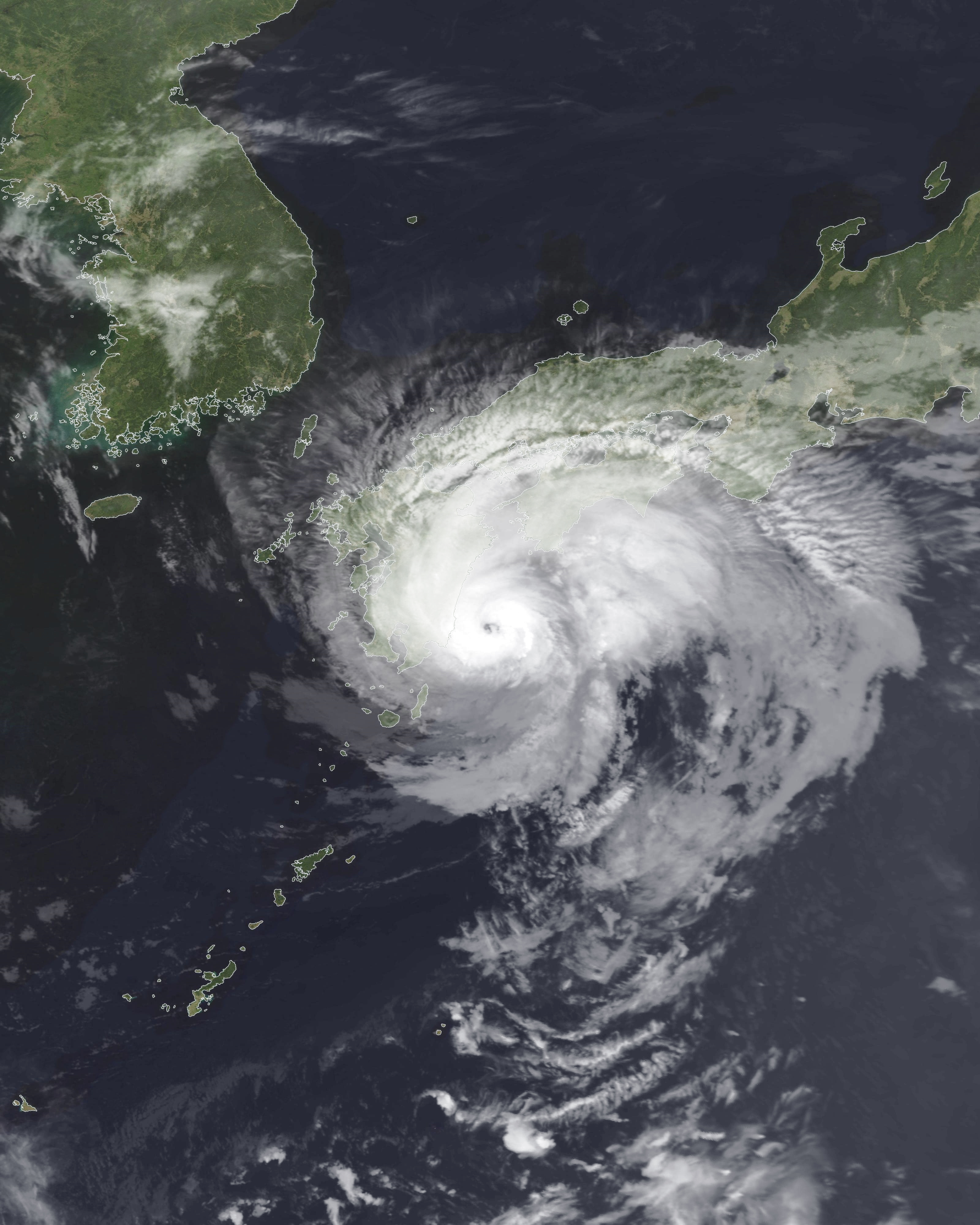
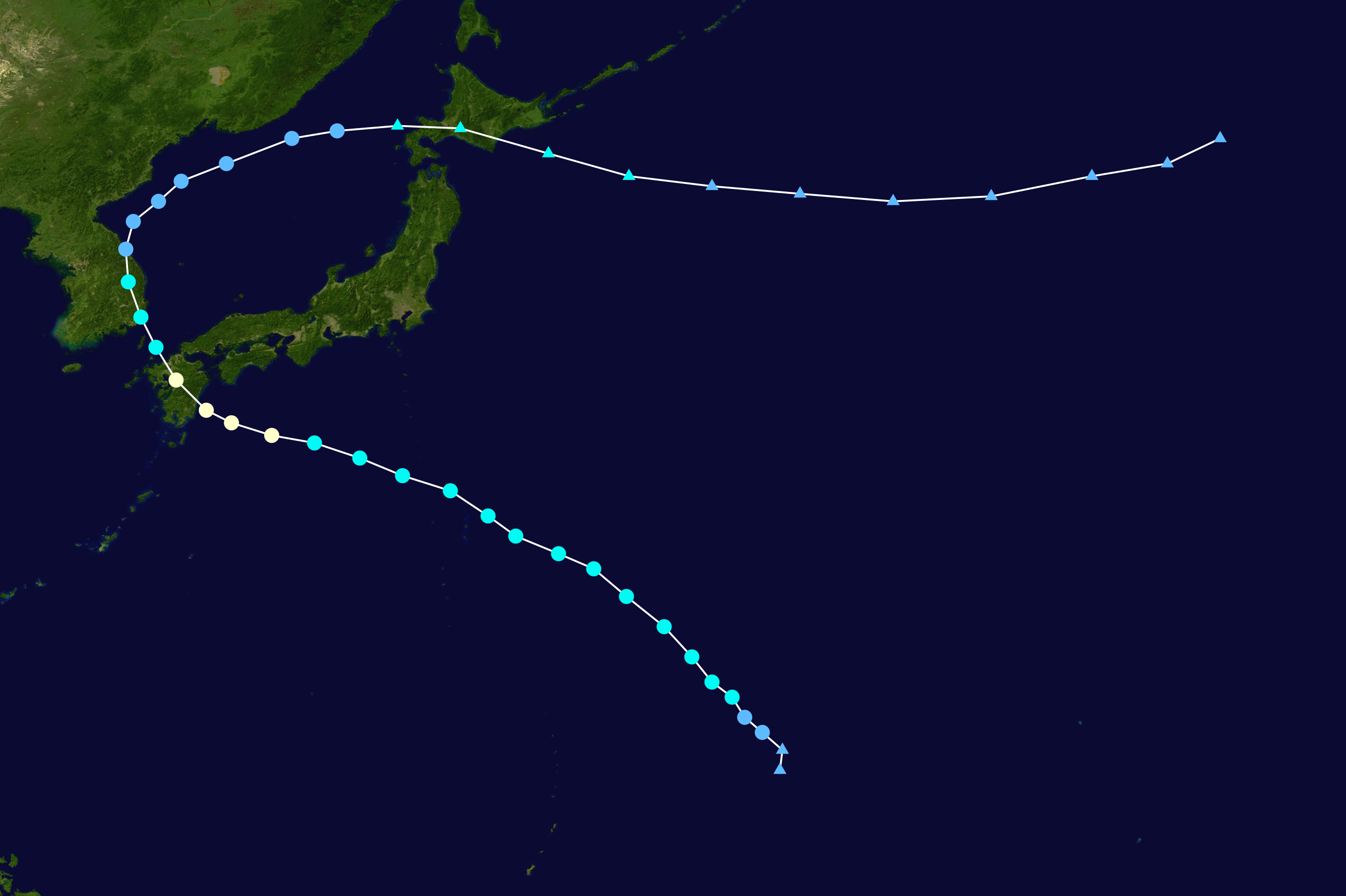
- Duration: August 1 – August 8
- Peak intensity: 130 km/h (80 mph) (10-min); 970 hPa (mbar)

On August 1, a tropical depression formed to the east of Mariana Islands. By midnight on August 1, the depression rapidly intensified to be Tropical Storm Francisco. Over the next few days, Francisco gradually strengthened and became a severe tropical storm on August 3. It then became a typhoon 12 hours later. It made landfall in southern Japan and it weakened to tropical storm, then later to tropical depression as it began curving north-eastward. It later transitioned into an extratropical storm as it crossed over north Japan.

In anticipation of coastal flooding, 20,020 people were evacuated from Kokuraminami-ku and Moji-ku. Transportation in the affected region was disrupted, with 130 flights cancelled and the Kyushu Railway Company suspending train service. Striking Kyushu as a typhoon, Francisco brought heavy rain and strong winds to much of the island. Rainfall accumulations exceeded 120 mm (4.7 in) in Nobeoka and 110 mm (4.3 in) in Saiki. Nobeoka observed a local hourly rainfall record of 95.5 mm (3.76 in). A maximum wind gust of 143 km/h (89 mph) was observed at Miyazaki Airport, the highest August wind gust on record for the city. One person drowned in a flooded river in Kokonoe. Two people suffered injury after being knocked over by strong winds.

=== Typhoon Lekima (Hanna) ===
- Violent typhoon (JMA)
- Category 4 super typhoon (SSHWS)
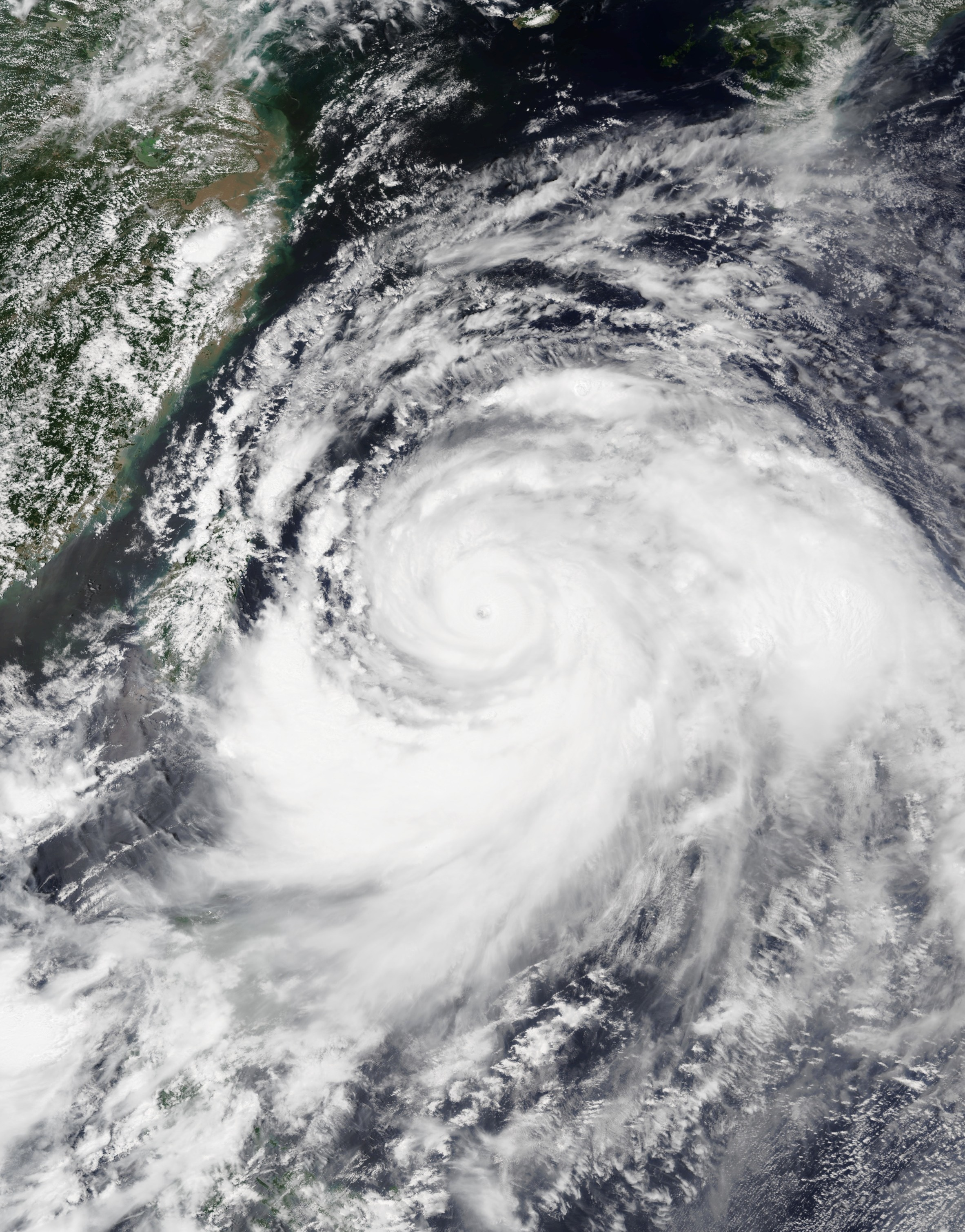
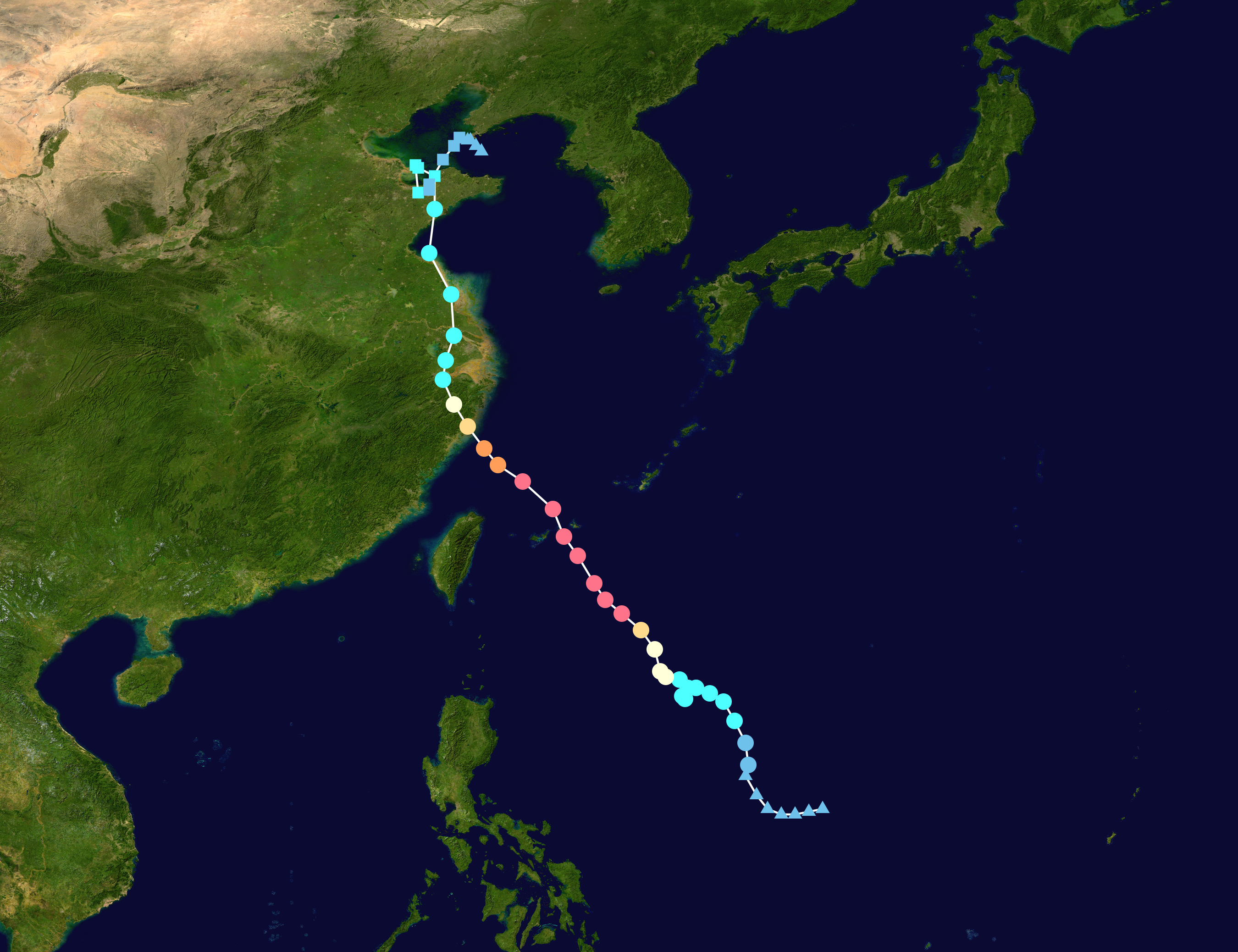
- Duration: August 2 – August 13
- Peak intensity: 195 km/h (120 mph) (10-min); 925 hPa (mbar)

On August 2, the JMA began monitoring a tropical depression that had developed in the Philippine Sea. It was named Hanna by PAGASA. Tropical Depression Hanna strengthened into a tropical storm a day later, and was given the international name Lekima. Lekima soon started to intensify as it moves west-northwestwards, becoming a severe tropical storm on August 4, and rapidly intensifying in the favorable waters, which allowed Lekima reach Category 3-equivalent typhoon intensity on August 7, and the storm underwent rapid intensification, and soon becoming a Category 4-equivalent super typhoon within just 2 hours.

The typhoon underwent an eyewall replacement cycle by the following morning, and began to weaken as it did so, as the South China Sea was not favorable for further intensification. Lekima made landfall in Wenling, Zhejiang at 12:30 a.m. CST August 10 (16:30 UTC August 9).

The system continued to weaken as it moved inland. Lekima then changed its trajectory from west-northwest to north, battering East China. The system kept moving inland and weakened to a tropical depression. Soon afterward, Lekima started to undergo an extratropical transition, with the JTWC discontinuing advisories on the storm. The remnants of Lekima made their way to the Korean Peninsula as an extratropical storm.

Though Lekima, known as Hanna in the Philippines, did not directly affect the Philippines, the storm enhanced the southwest monsoon, which caused heavy rain in the nation. Three boats sank in Guimaras Strait; 31 people died and three were missing.

In China, Lekima was the 2nd costliest storm in Chinese history, only behind Fitow of 2013, as flooding from Lekima washed away farms and houses in mainland China after its landfall, as it still was a Category 3 by its landfall.

=== Typhoon Krosa ===
- Typhoon (JMA)
- Category 3 typhoon (SSHWS)
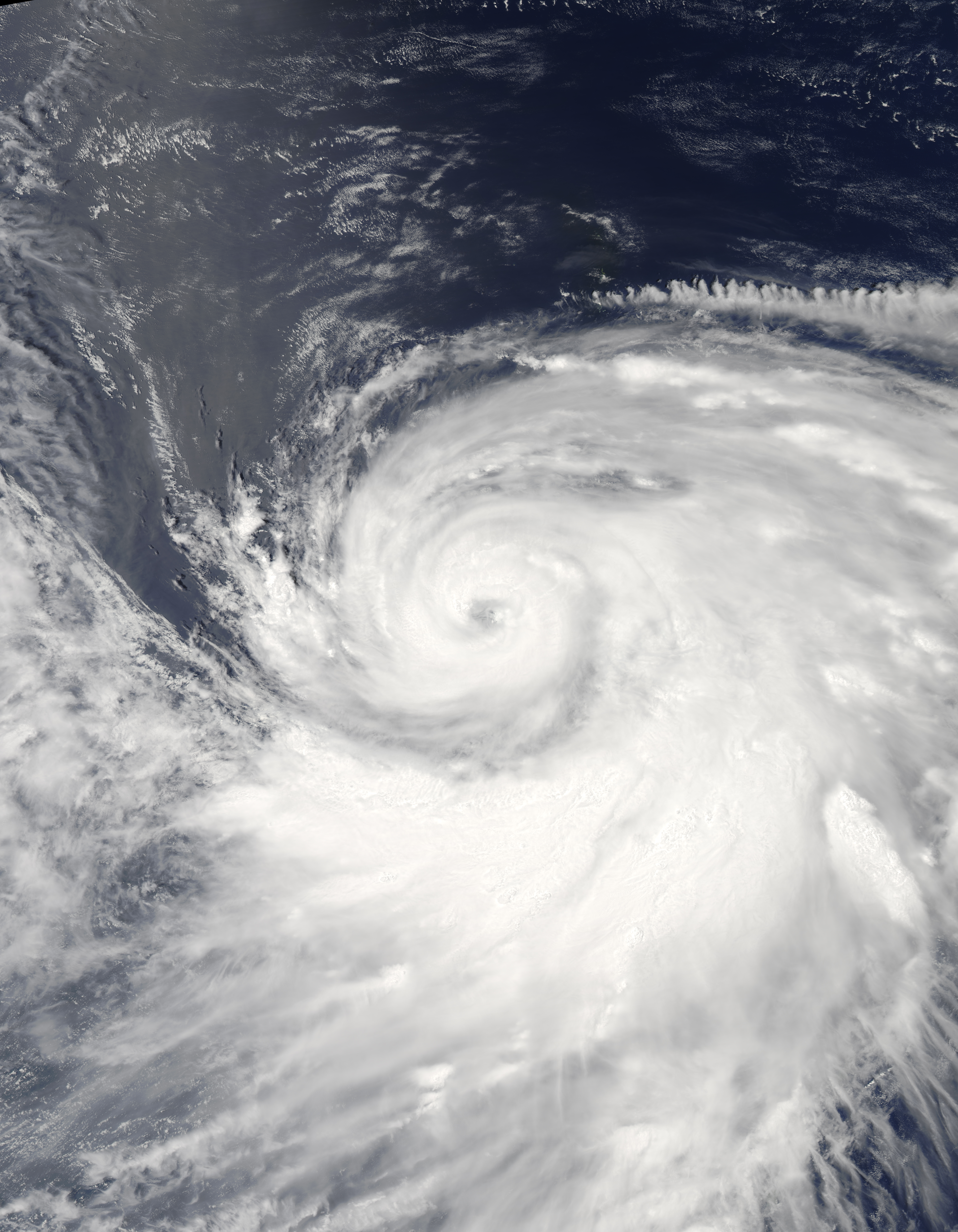
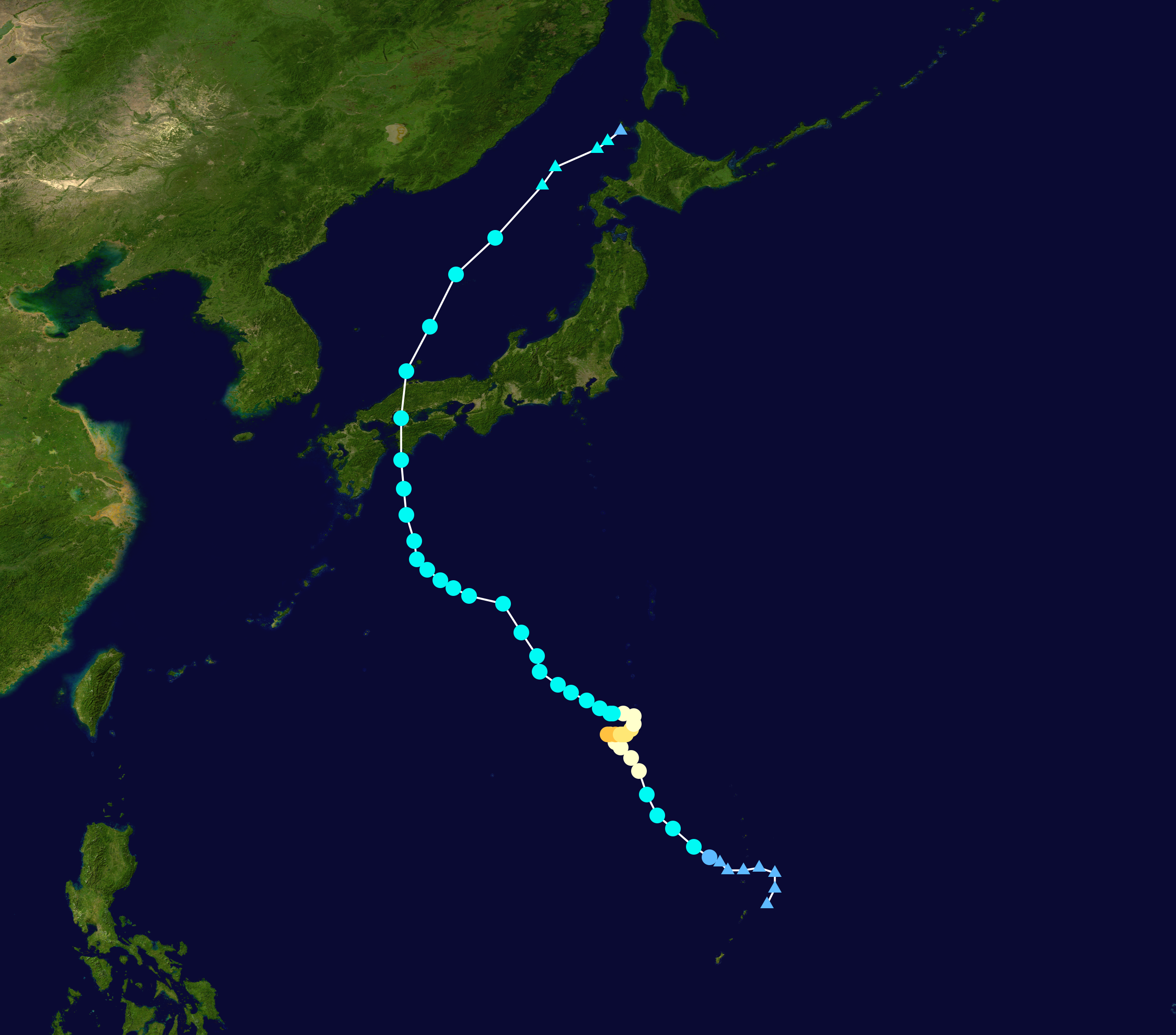
- Duration: August 5 – August 16
- Peak intensity: 140 km/h (85 mph) (10-min); 965 hPa (mbar)

A tropical depression formed near Mariana Islands on August 5. By August 6, it intensified into a tropical storm, and was named Krosa by the JMA. Tropical Storm Krosa soon became a typhoon, and rapidly intensified to become a category 3-equivalent typhoon on August 8. Upwelling of cooler waters induced weakening thereafter; by August 13, Krosa weakened below typhoon intensity. Krosa continued moving, albeit slowly, towards Japan with little change in intensity. On August 11 Krosa expanded into 950-mile (1,530 km) in diameter giant storm. Moderately conducive conditions were unable to aid Krosa in strengthening, and it stayed the same intensity before landfall in Japan. On August 14, Krosa emerged in the Sea of Japan and a few days later on August 16 Krosa transitioned into an extratropical low.

The typhoon brought torrential rain to parts of Shikoku and Honshu, with accumulations peaking at 869.5 mm (34.23 in) at Yanase in Kochi Prefecture. Wind gusts reached 151 km/h (94 mph) in Muroto. Rough seas produced by the storm killed two people while flooding killed one other. Fifty-five people were injured in various incidents. Damage in Japan amounted to be ¥2.177 billion (US$20.5 million).

=== Severe Tropical Storm Bailu (Ineng) ===
- Severe tropical storm (JMA)
- Tropical storm (SSHWS)
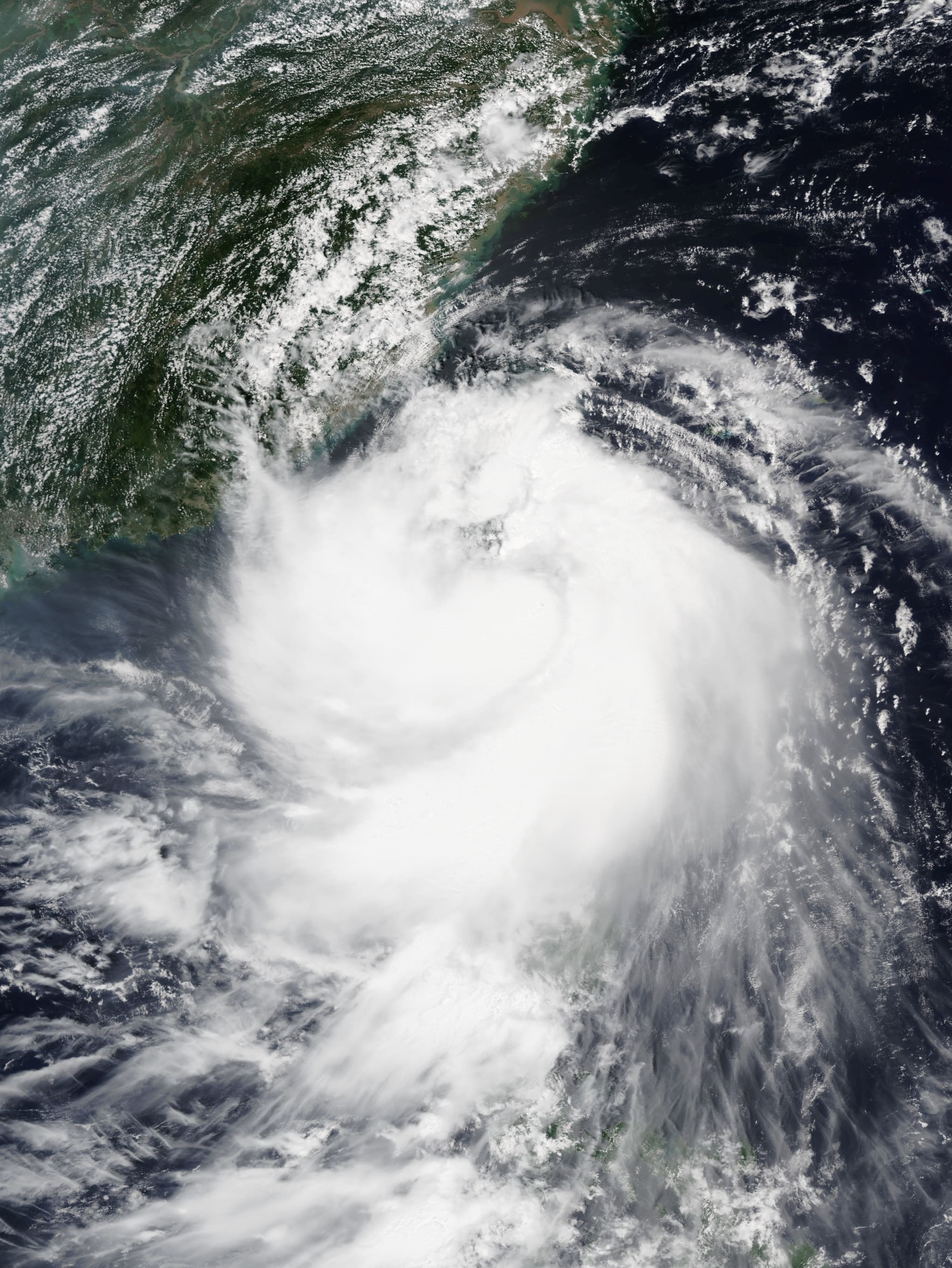
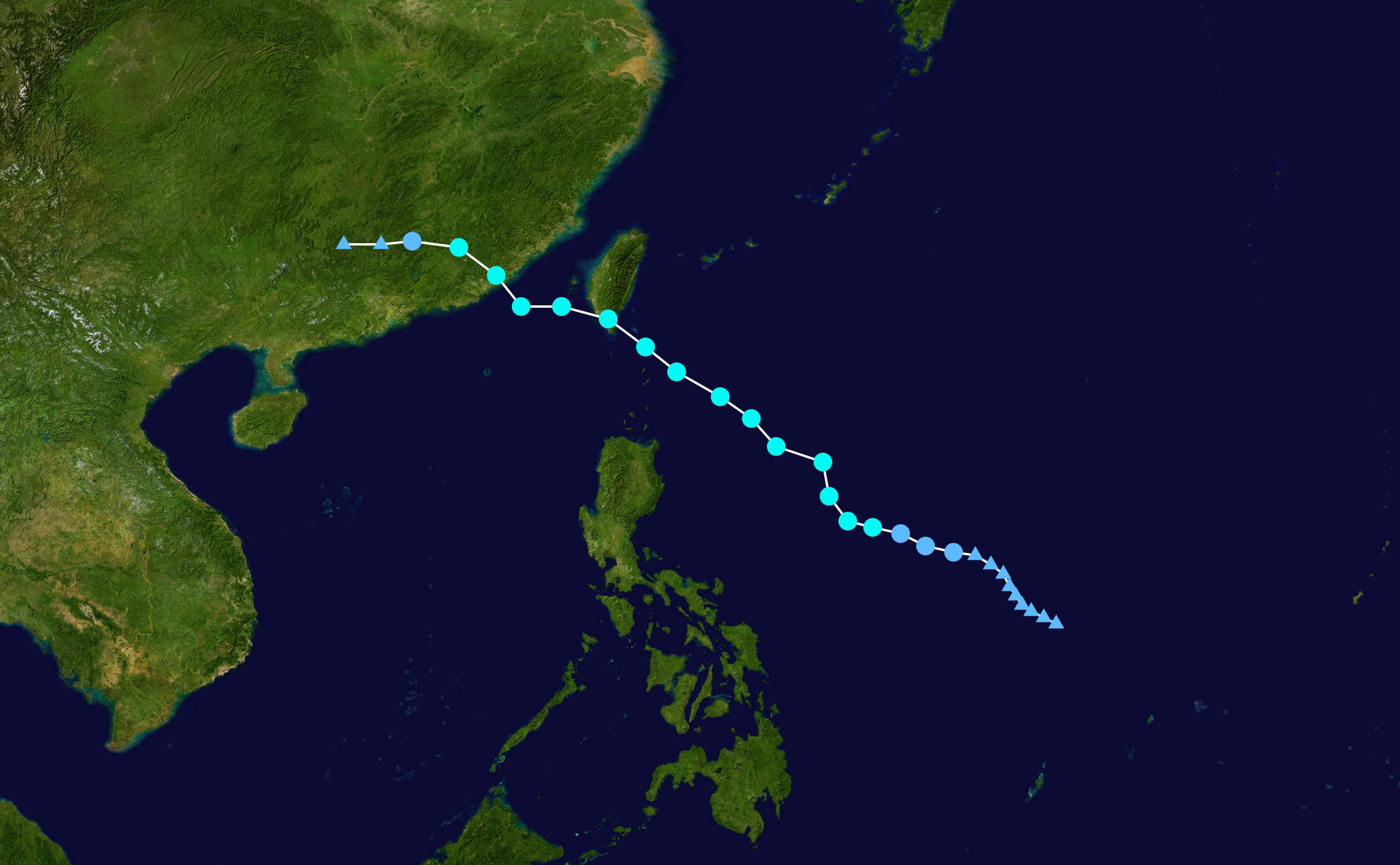
- Duration: August 19 – August 26
- Peak intensity: 95 km/h (60 mph) (10-min); 985 hPa (mbar)

On August 20, a tropical depression formed to the west of Mariana Islands. The PAGASA later upgraded the system to Tropical Depression Ineng. On the next day, the JMA designated Tropical Depression Ineng as Tropical Storm Bailu, and the JTWC classified the system as Tropical Depression 12W. Bailu gradually intensified over the Philippine Sea, and later intensifying into a Severe Tropical Storm. At 13:00 TST (05:00 UTC) on August 24, Bailu made landfall over Manzhou Township, Pingtung County, Taiwan. Bailu weakened a little before making landfall in Fujian, China and dissipating late on August 26.

Although Bailu did not make landfall in the Philippines, two people were killed and a state of calamity was declared in Ilocos Norte due to flooding. It also caused Php1.1 billion (US$21 million) damage in the province. Bailu killed one person, and injured nine others in Taiwan. Institutional damages were calculated to be TWD 2.31 million (US$74,000), while agricultural damage reached TWD 175 million (US$5.63 million). Damage in Fujian reached ¥10.49 million (US$1.5 million).

=== Tropical Storm Podul (Jenny) ===
- Tropical storm (JMA)
- Tropical storm (SSHWS)
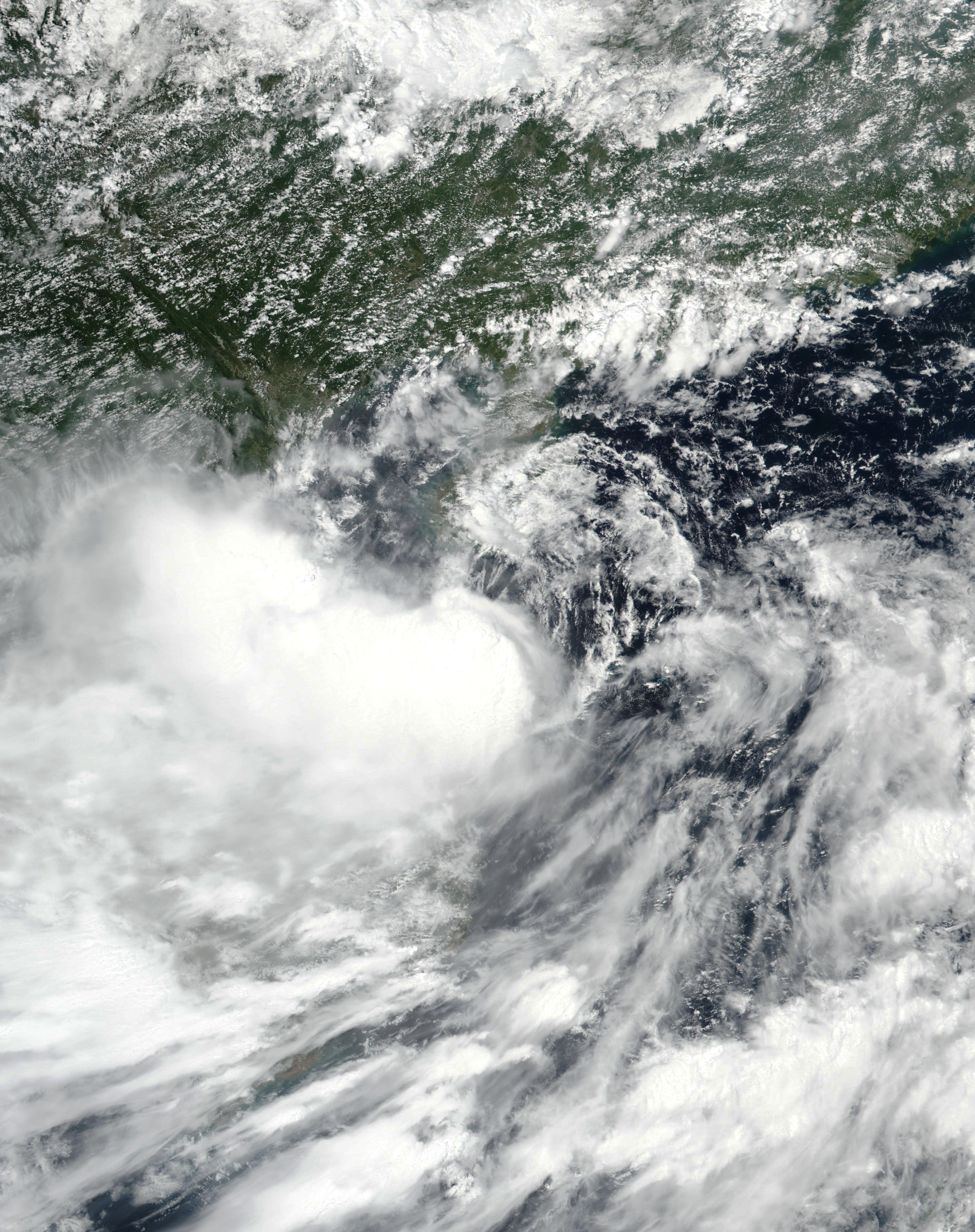
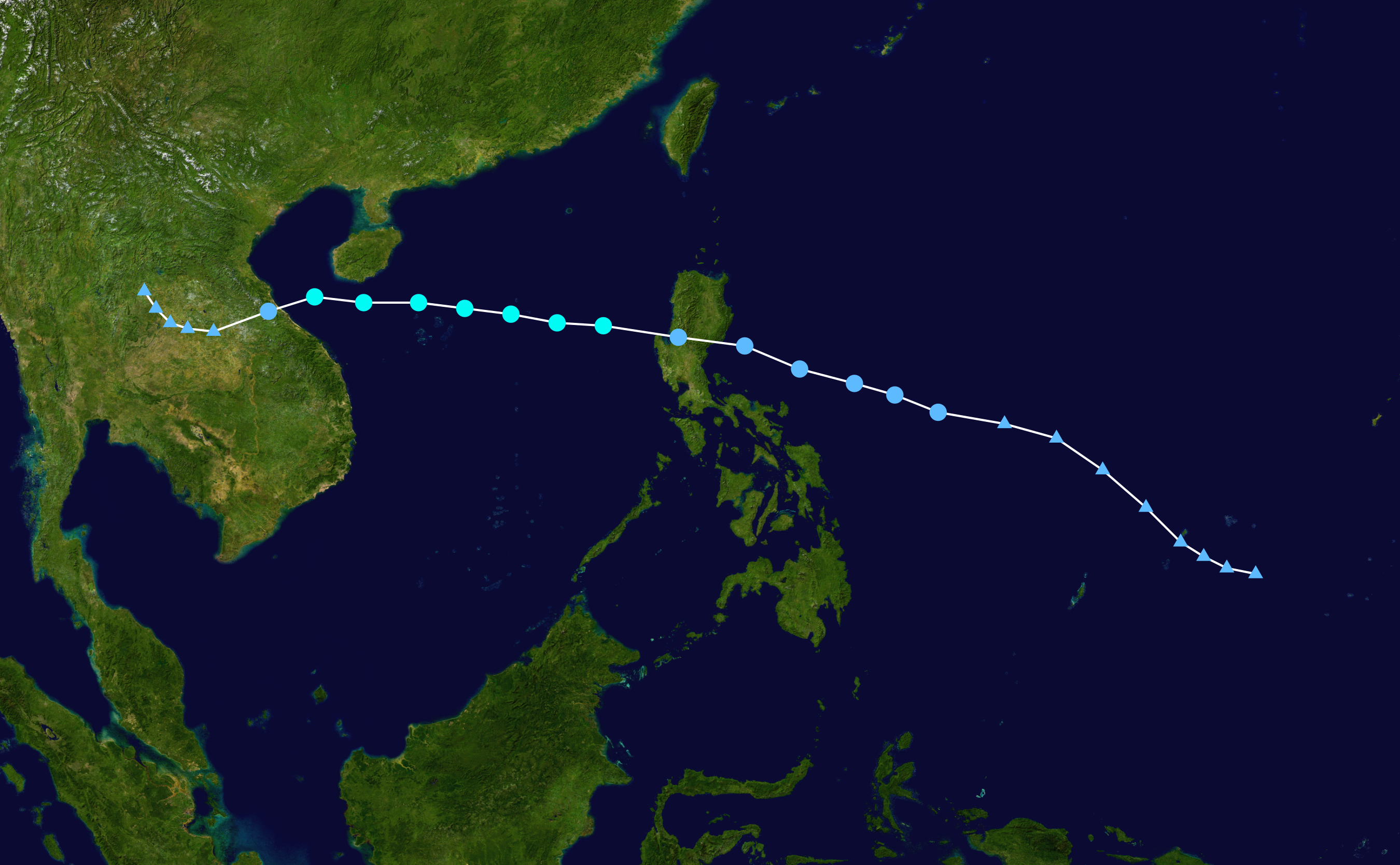
- Duration: August 24 – August 31
- Peak intensity: 75 km/h (45 mph) (10-min); 992 hPa (mbar)

On August 25, the Japan Meteorological Agency began to track a tropical depression near Ifalik. On the next day, PAGASA named the storm Jenny, and the Joint Typhoon Warning Center designated the storm as 13W. On August 27, the system intensified to become a tropical storm, and was given the name Podul. Podul made landfall in Casiguran, Aurora at 10:40 p.m. PST (14:40 UTC). It then emerged over the South China Sea, intensifying slightly, before making landfall on Vietnam.

In the Philippines, Podul left 2 dead and a damage of ₱240 million (US$4.59 million). Podul triggered tornado in Hainan, which killed eight people and left two others injured. Damage of this tornado reached ¥16.22 million (US$2.27 million). In Vietnam, the storm left six dead and two missing. Losses in Sơn La Province exceeds 1.8 billion đồng (US$77,000).

=== Tropical Storm Kajiki (Kabayan) ===
- Tropical storm (JMA)
- Tropical storm (SSHWS)
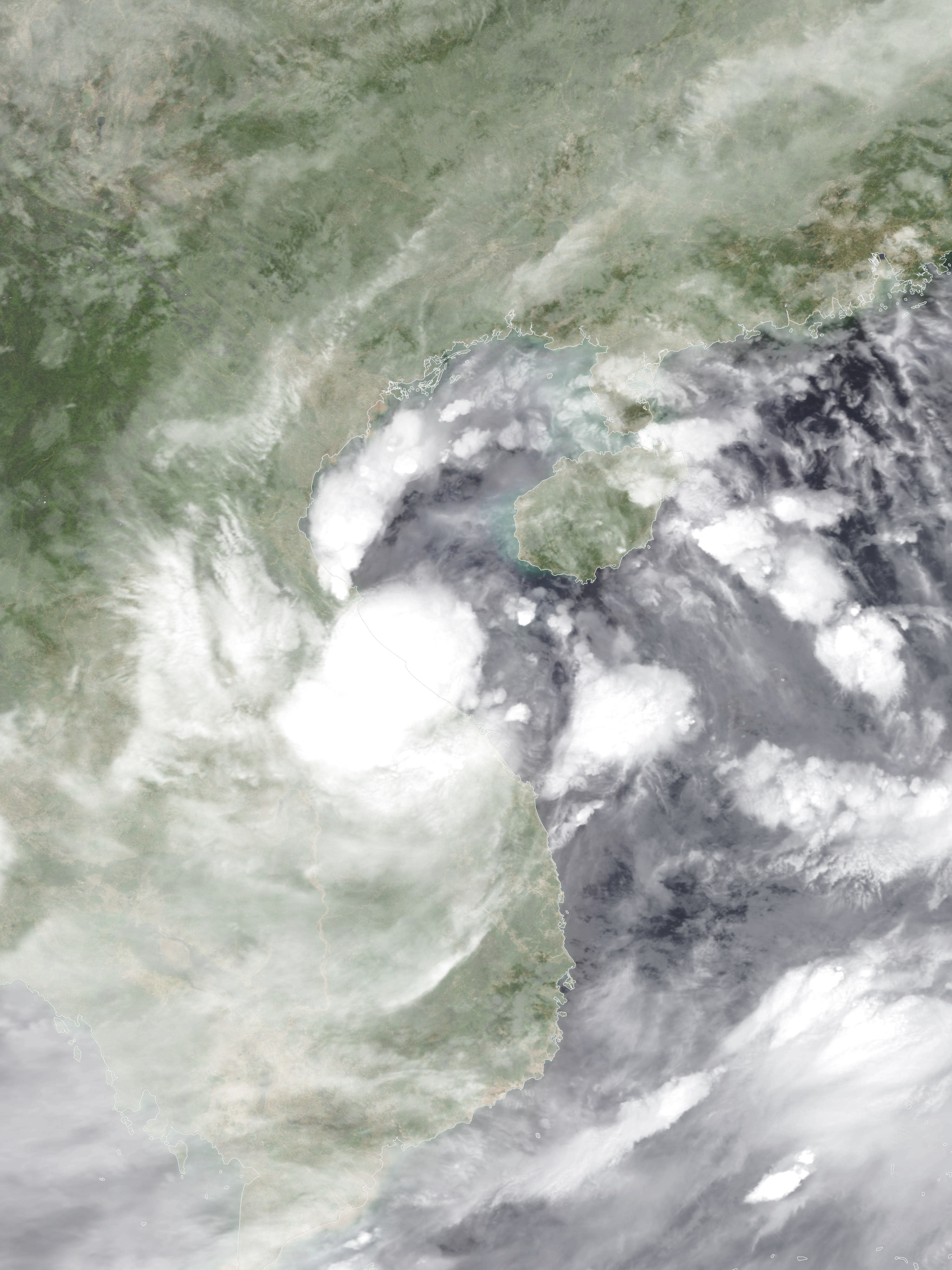
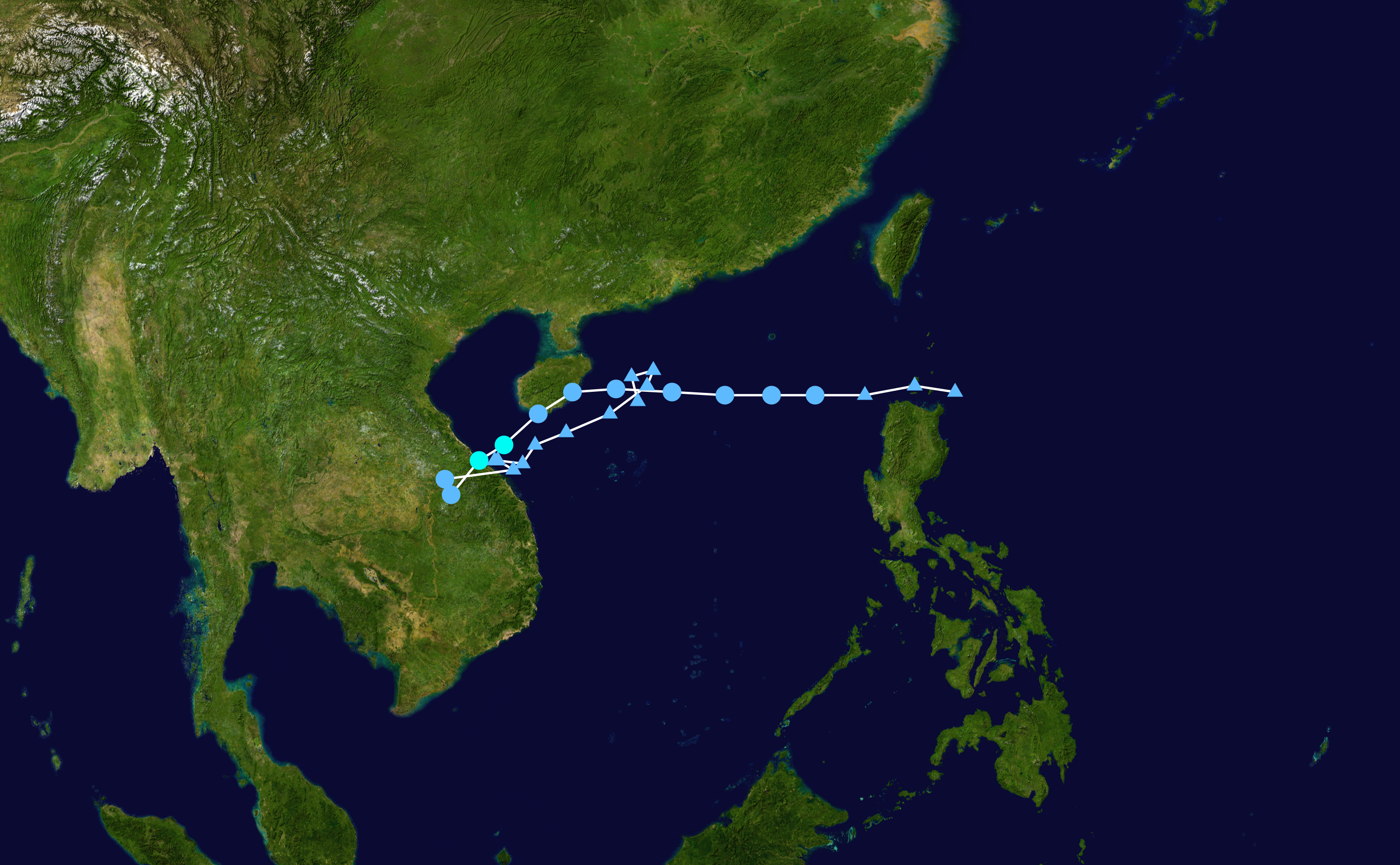
- Duration: August 30 – September 6
- Peak intensity: 65 km/h (40 mph) (10-min); 996 hPa (mbar)

On August 30, a tropical depression formed to the east of Luzon. On the same day, it briefly weakened into a low pressure area and regenerated six hours later into a tropical depression at midnight on August 31. It passed through the Batanes Islands, and PAGASA upgraded the system to a tropical depression, naming it Kabayan; however, the system exited their area of responsibility shortly thereafter. In the same time the Joint Typhoon Warning Center issued a Tropical Cyclone Formation Alert (TCFA) for Kabayan. Kabayan made landfall in Hainan by September 1, and re-emerged over the South China Sea later, and was upgraded by the JTWC to a monsoon depression. By late September 2, the JTWC began issuing advisories on the system, giving the identifier 16W, while the JMA upgraded the system to a tropical storm, naming it Kajiki. Shortly thereafter, Kajiki made landfall over Vietnam. Kajiki then re-emerged on the South China Sea, interacting with a weak tropical depression in Hainan, and then exhibiting to re-intensify once more, as it was absorbing the tropical depression to its northeast. However, Kajiki remained its intensity as a weak tropical depression after it had recurved backed over open waters. The system meandered in a slow northeastward direction until it had weakened and was last noticed on September 7.

Because of the slow movement over Vietnam, Kajiki brought heavy rains and triggered flooding. Rainfall were recorded to as high as 530 mm within the regions. At least six people died and nine others remained missing. Agricultural losses were estimated to be ₫300 billion (US$76.2 million).

=== Typhoon Lingling (Liwayway) ===
- Very strong typhoon (JMA)
- Category 4 typhoon (SSHWS)
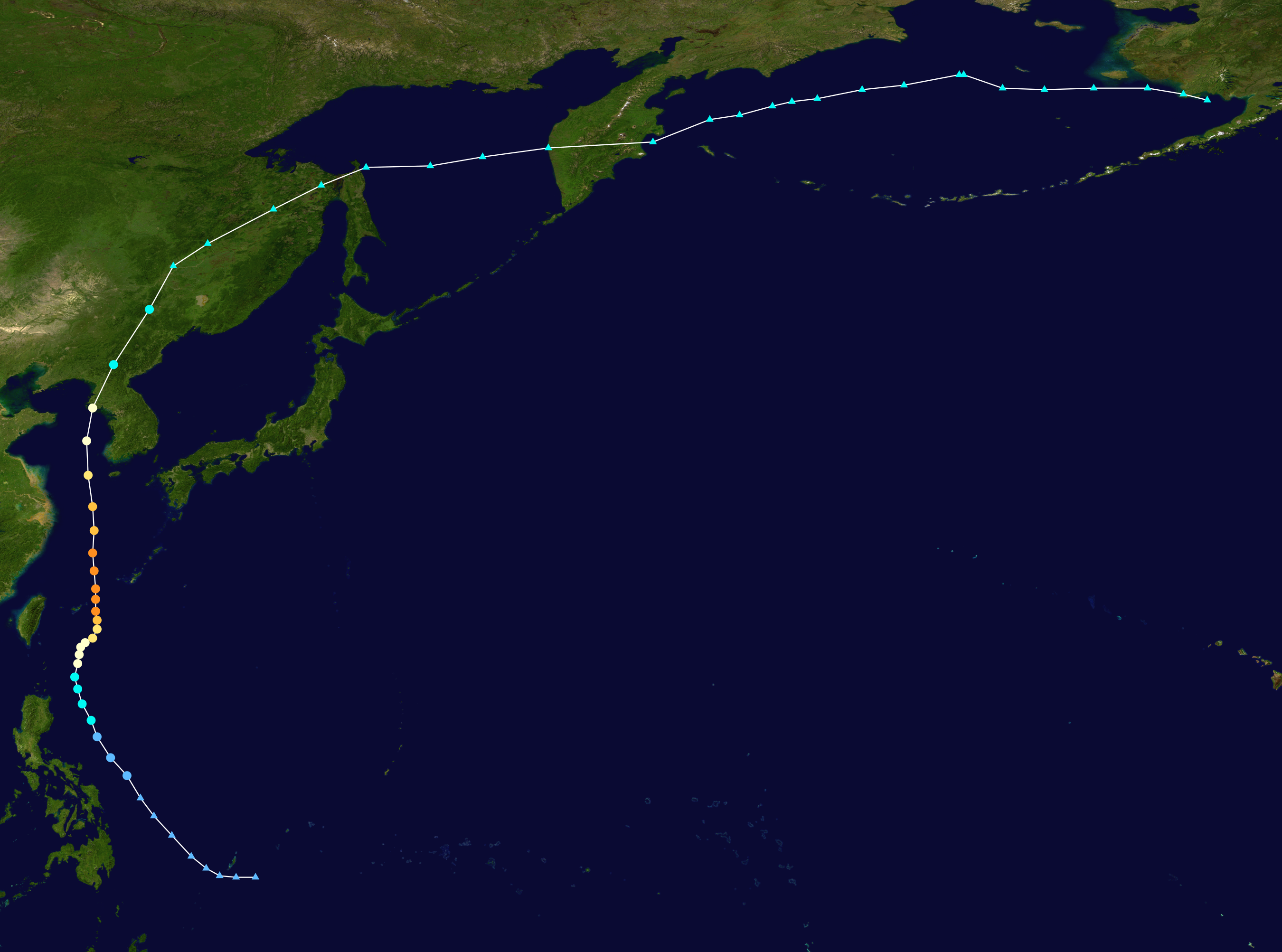
- Duration: August 31 – September 7
- Peak intensity: 175 km/h (110 mph) (10-min); 940 hPa (mbar)

On August 31, three tropical depressions formed, one of which was east of Mindanao. The Joint Typhoon Warning Center then issued a Tropical Cyclone Formation Alert for the system. On September 1, the Philippines agency PAGASA upgraded the system and named it Liwayway. The Joint Typhoon Warning Center then gave Liwayway the designation 15W. Liwayway then began to organize itself while in the Philippine Sea. Early on September 2, the Japan Meteorological Agency reported that Liwayway intensified into a tropical storm, and named the system Lingling (1913). Lingling then continued to organize itself, and soon later, the JTWC upgraded Lingling to a tropical storm. Lingling then formed an eye, as the JMA upgraded it to a severe tropical storm. Lingling then became a Category 1 typhoon late on September 3. Typhoon Lingling (Liwayway) then strengthened piece-by-piece, and the eye began to slowly consolidate around the center of the eye. Despite being away from the Philippines, it was enhancing the Southwest Monsoon, and causing rains in many parts of the country, while floods in other areas have still not subsided from the previous storms that passed the Extreme Northern Luzon area. Lingling then underwent rapid intensification from favorable conditions near the South China Sea and soon became a Category 2, and later a Category 4 on the Saffir–Simpson scale, as it was east of Taiwan. The eye became clear and wide as Lingling intensified even further. Lingling, moved out of the Philippine Area of Responsibility, and PAGASA issued its final advisory on Lingling. Lingling then made landfall as a Category 4 on Miyako-jima, then continued to intensify, and reaching its peak intensity as a super typhoon, since Lekima a month earlier. It gradually weakened as it was east of China. At 2:30 p.m. KST (05:30 UTC), Lingling made landfall in South Hwanghae Province, North Korea with winds of 130 km/h (81 mph), becoming the first typhoon and the strongest storm to strike the country. On September 8, Lingling weakened to a minimal tropical storm. It moved away from North Korea and the center moved to Russia, weakening even further.

Passing east of the Philippines, Lingling caused flooding in Luzon. Agricultural damage in Pampanga were amounted to ₱5.65 million (US$108,000). Economic loss in Okinawa Prefecture were at JP¥533 million (US$4.98 million). Passing west of South Korea, Lingling killed three people and injured ten others. Wind gusts reached 196 km/h (122 mph) in Heuksando, the strongest wind observed in the country since Maemi in 2003. About 161,000 households had experienced power outages. Damage nationwide were amounted to ₩28.76 billion (US$24.1 million). In North Korea, five people were dead with three others injured. The typhoon damaged 475 houses and buildings, as well as 46,200 ha (114,000 acres) of farmland. Lingling also passed through the Northeast China, damage were calculated at CN¥930 million (US$131 million). Moreover, Lingling's extratropical remnants caused flooding in the Russian Far East, with damage in the Jewish Autonomous Oblast amounting to ₽2 billion (US$30.4 million).

=== Typhoon Faxai ===
- Very strong typhoon (JMA)
- Category 4 typhoon (SSHWS)
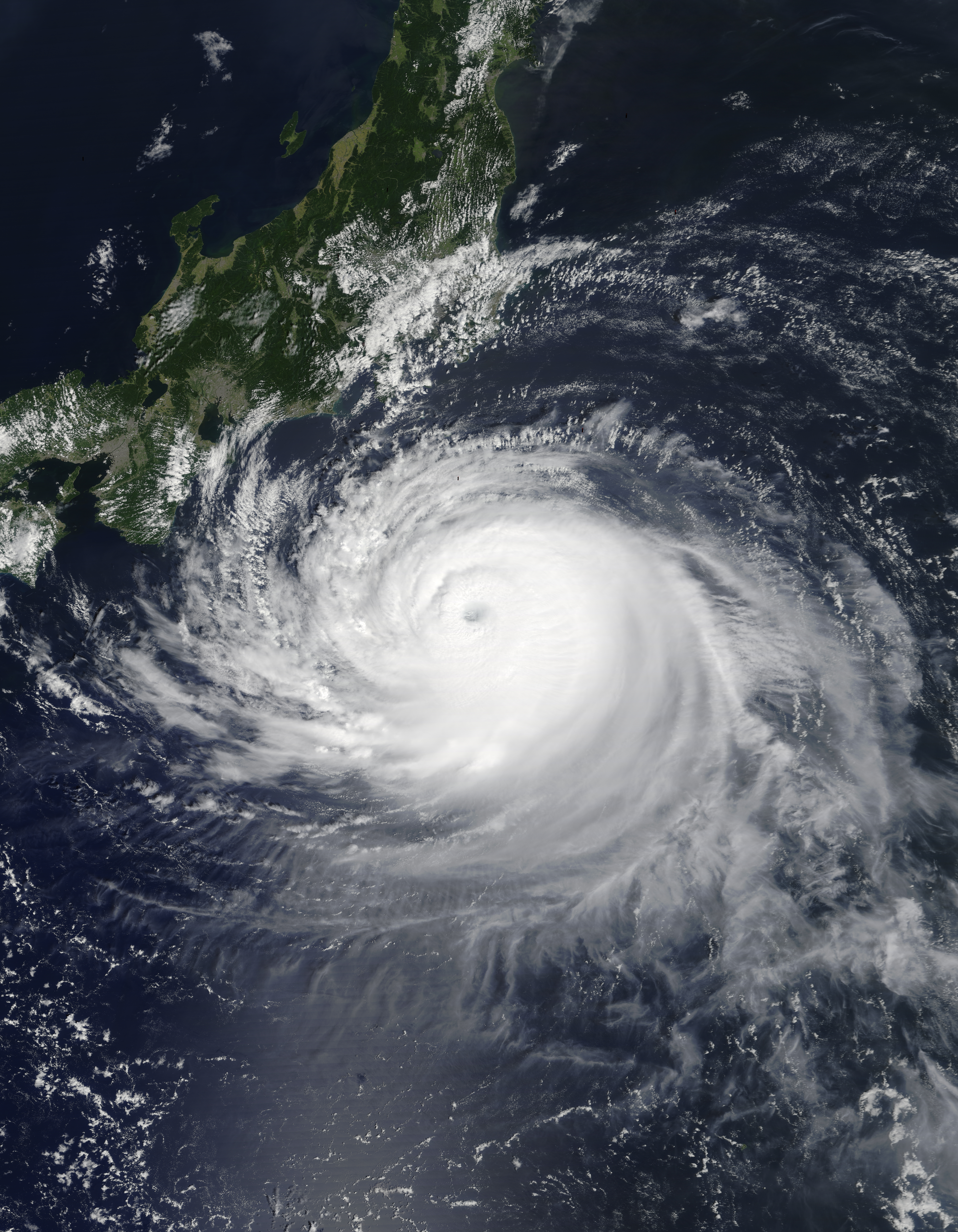
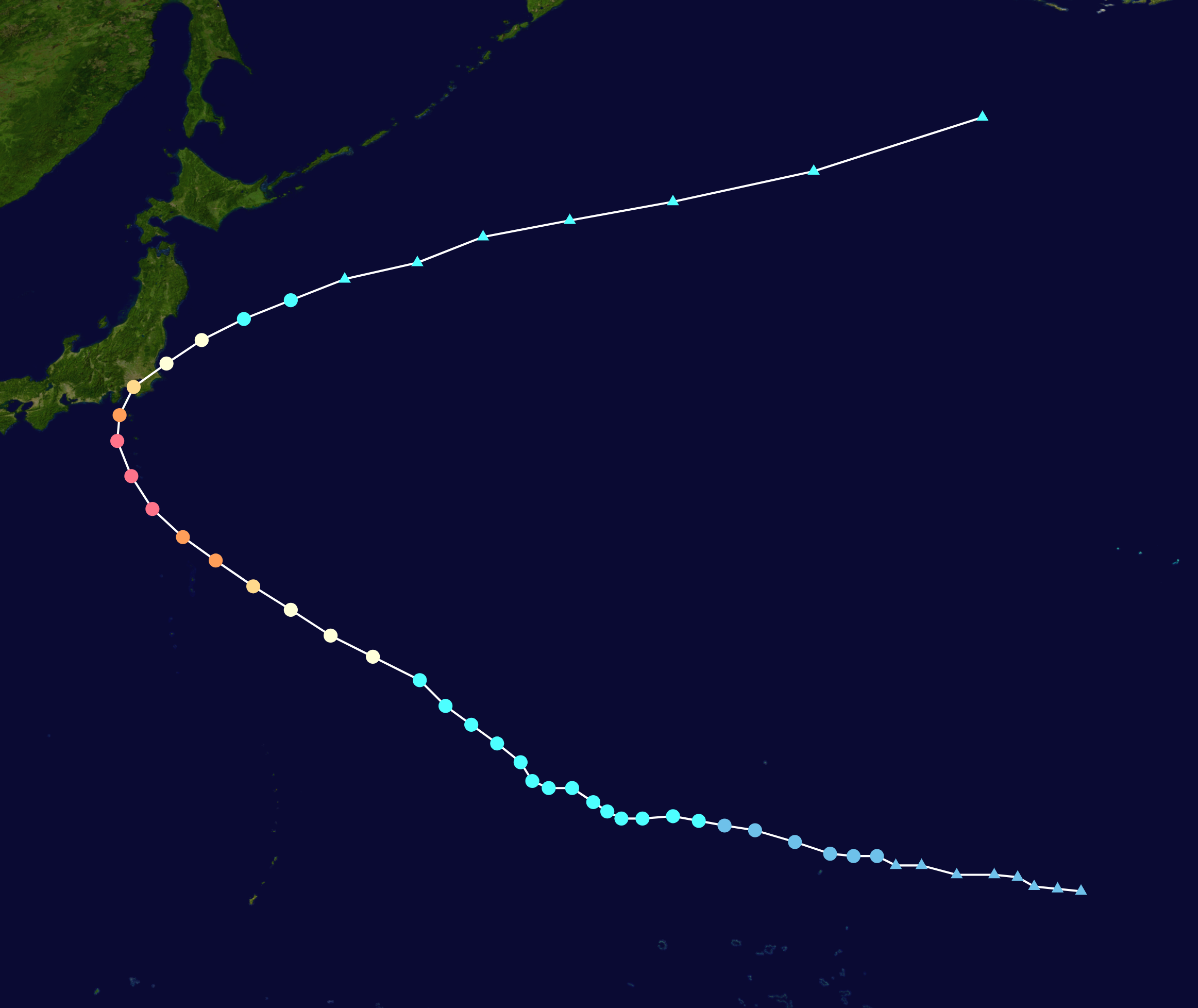
- Duration: September 2 – September 9
- Peak intensity: 155 km/h (100 mph) (10-min); 955 hPa (mbar)

At 18:00 UTC on August 29, a tropical depression formed just east of the International Date Line. It moved west across the Pacific Ocean the next day. It was then designated 14W by the Joint Typhoon Warning Center after they initiated advisories. By September 2, the JTWC upgraded 14W to a tropical storm, and maintained its intensity for a couple of days. Three days later, the Japan Meteorological Agency finally upgraded the system to a tropical storm, and named it Faxai. Faxai gradually intensified, reaching typhoon status on September 6. Faxai rapidly intensified into a Category 4 equivalent storm on September 8 and reaching its peak intensity. Faxai weakened slightly before making landfall in Chiba City shortly before 5:00 a.m. JST September 9.

Faxai was the first storm to strike the Kantō region since Mindulle in 2016, and the strongest storm to hit the region since Ma-on in 2004. Three people were killed and 147 others were injured. More than 390,000 people were urged to be evacuated. Faxai left 934,000 households without power. Trains service in JR East were cancelled due to the storm. Two people died from heatstroke because of the power outage. Damage in Japan reached US$10 billion.

=== Tropical Depression Marilyn ===
- Tropical depression (JMA)
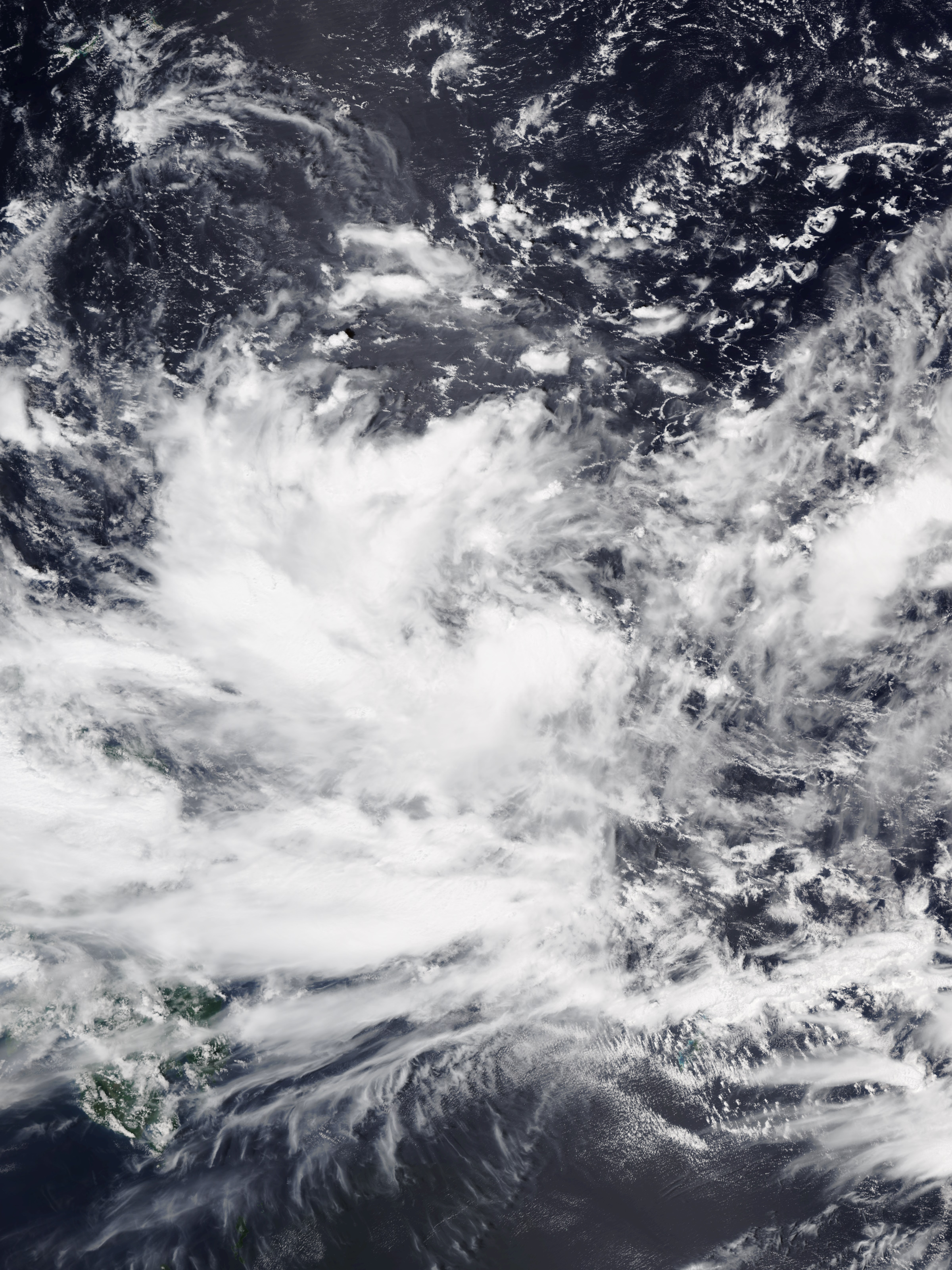
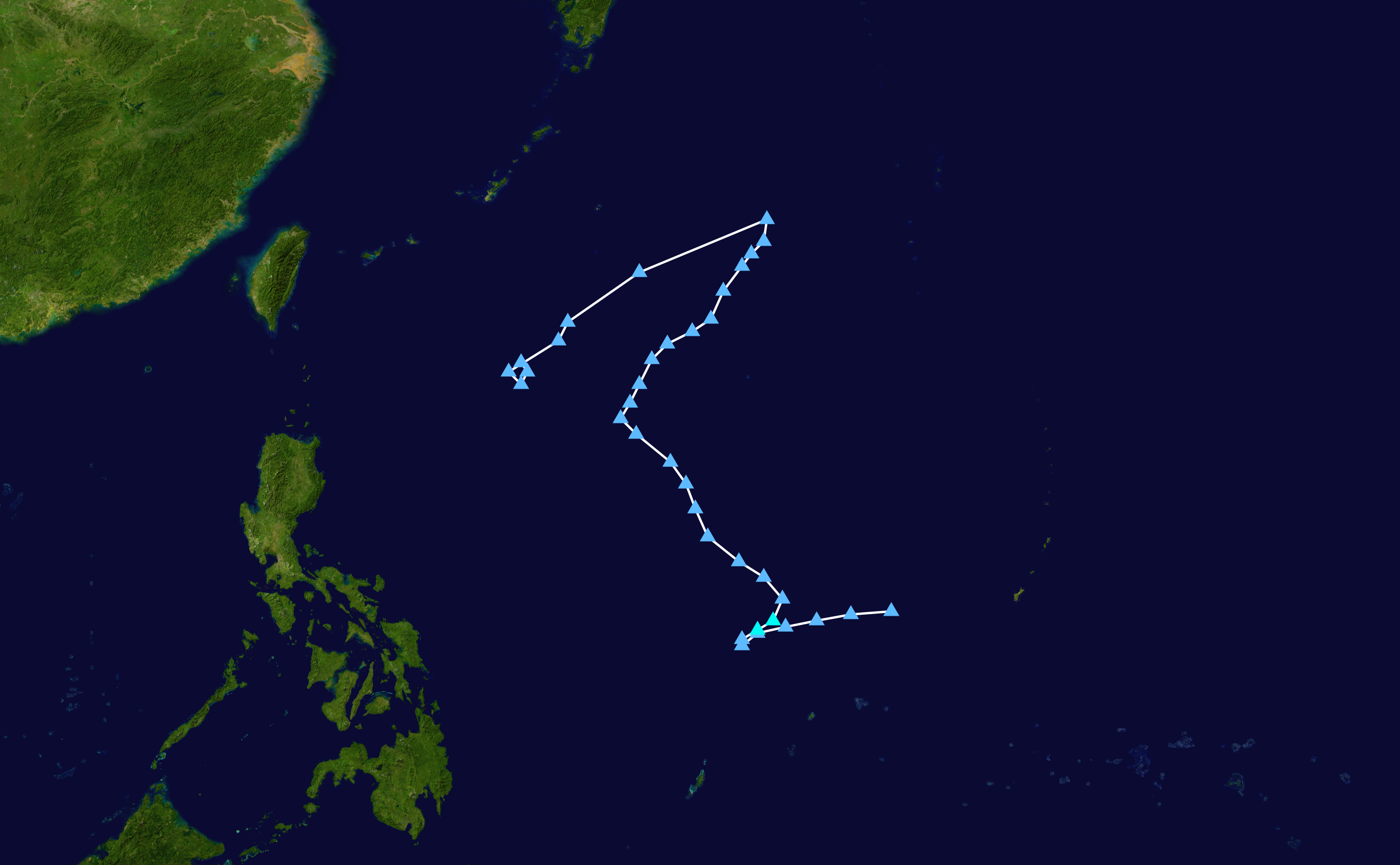
- Duration: September 10 – September 13
- Peak intensity: 55 km/h (35 mph) (10-min); 996 hPa (mbar)

A new low pressure system formed west of Guam on September 10 in the Philippine Sea. The Japan Meteorological Agency upgraded the system to a tropical depression. The system gradually developed by the next day. On the same day, the JTWC upgraded the system into a monsoon depression, due to the broad and disorganized nature of the system. JMA also raised a gale warning for the depression around the same time. By September 12, the depression entered the Philippine Area of Responsibility, and was named Marilyn.

Later that day, JMA cancelled the gale warning. By the next day, the JTWC issued a Tropical Cyclone Formation Alert on the system, which will later cancel the next day. Marilyn then dissipated as it exited the Philippine Area of Responsibility, and the Joint Typhoon Warning Center cancelled the Tropical Cyclone Formation Alert for Marilyn. The remnants of Marilyn drifted northeast, then southwest, back into the Philippine Area of Responsibility from an interaction with nearby Tropical Storm Peipah. However due to its "monsoonal gyre" structure, the system produced a new vortex that soon developed into another tropical depression, which eventually developed into Tropical Storm Tapah, while the main circulation of Marilyn interacted with another non-warning tropical depression southeast of Japan. The JTWC, however, treated them as the same system.

High surf from Tropical Depression Marilyn in Puerto Princesa capsized 6 boats at sea.

=== Tropical Storm Peipah ===
- Tropical storm (JMA)
- Tropical storm (SSHWS)
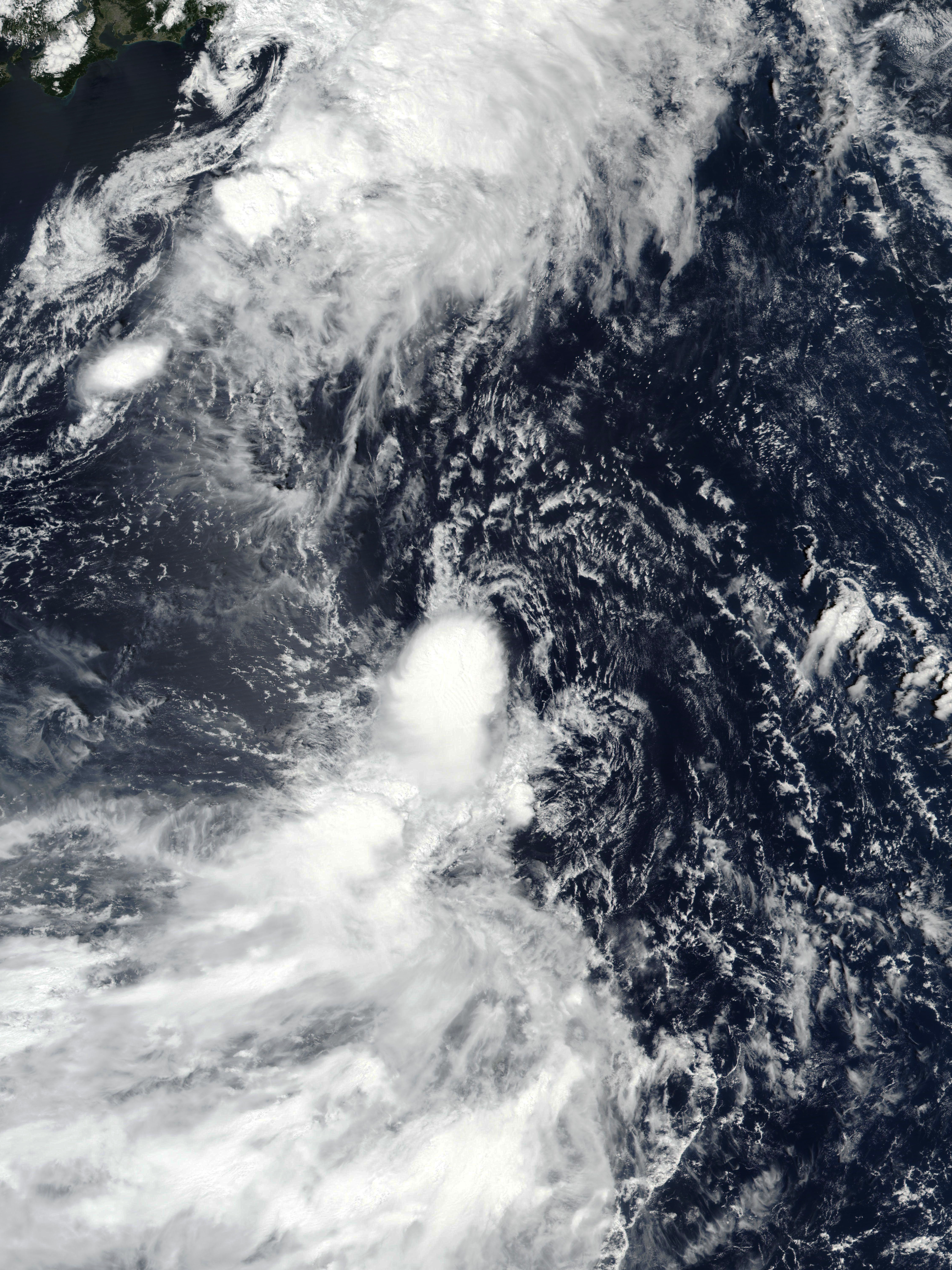
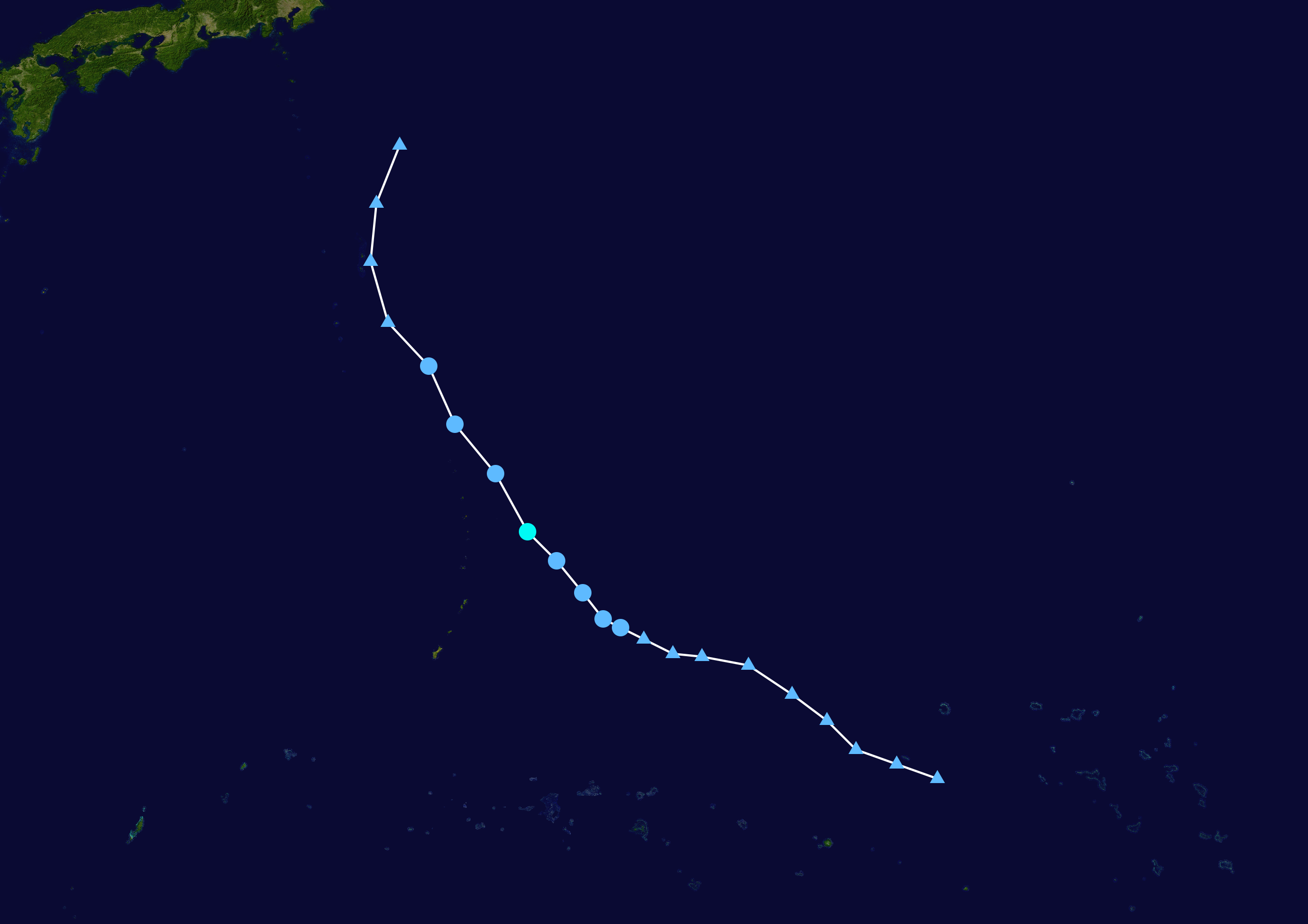
- Duration: September 12 – September 16
- Peak intensity: 65 km/h (40 mph) (10-min); 1000 hPa (mbar)

On September 14, a tropical depression formed. The Joint Typhoon Warning Center later issued a Tropical Cyclone Formation Alert and as it gradually developed, it was given the designation 17W. Despite the high wind shear, the depression soon intensified to a tropical storm and was named Peipah. Peipah sustained itself for 12 hours before weakening again into a tropical depression according to the Joint Typhoon Warning Center. Tropical Storm Peipah later succumbed to the wind shear, weakening into a remnant low.

=== Typhoon Tapah (Nimfa) ===
- Typhoon (JMA)
- Category 1 typhoon (SSHWS)
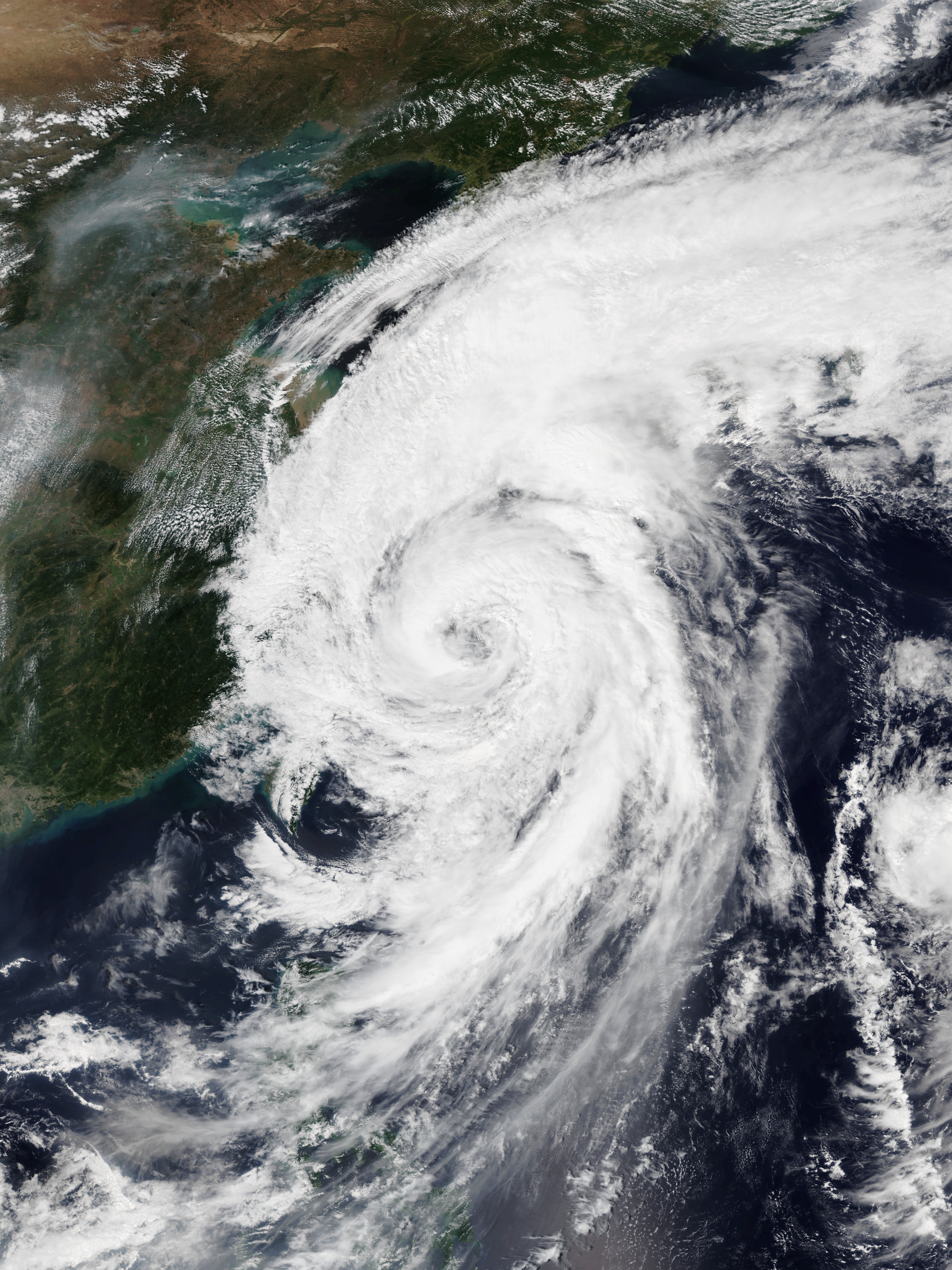
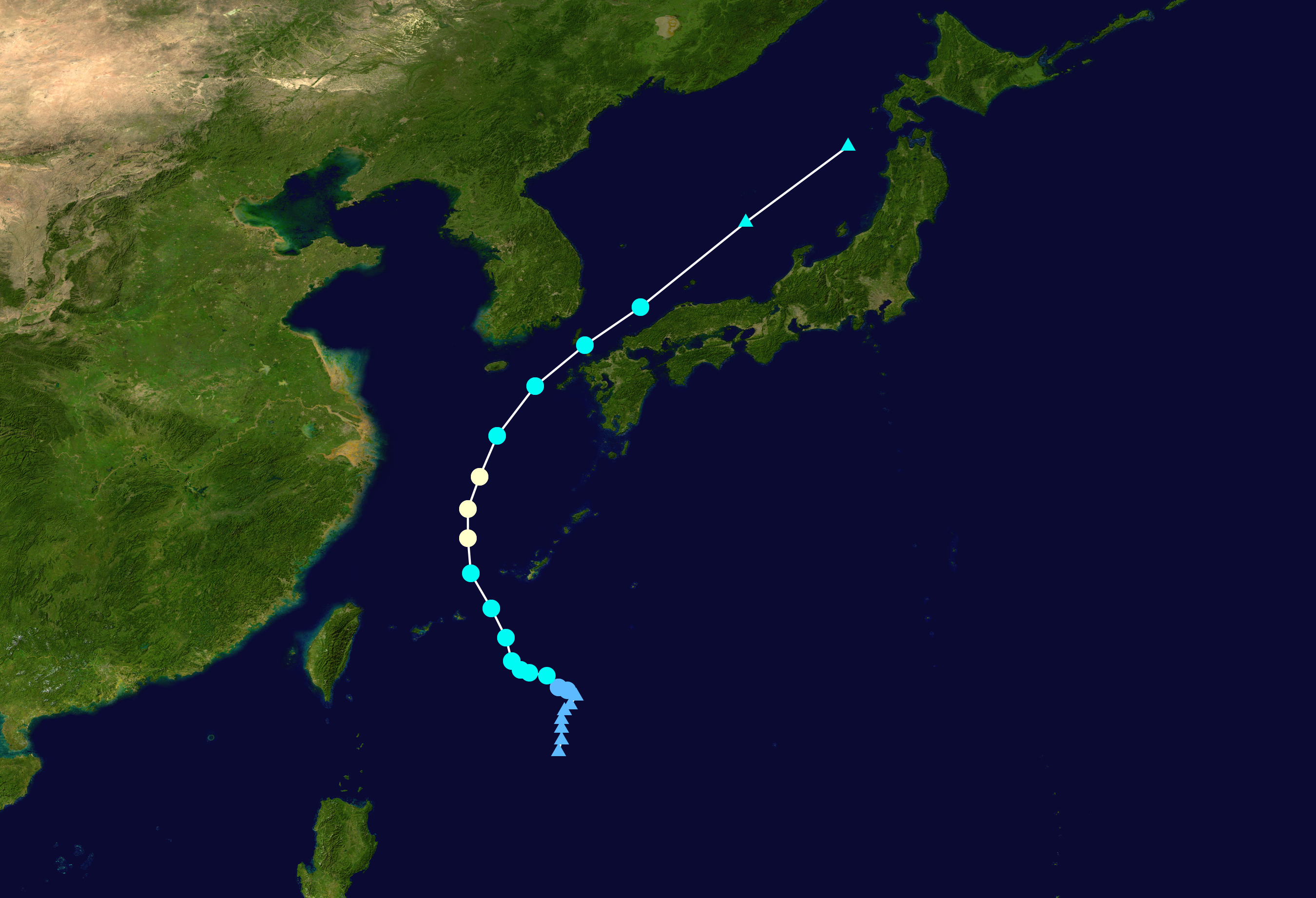
- Duration: September 17 – September 22
- Peak intensity: 120 km/h (75 mph) (10-min); 970 hPa (mbar)

On September 17, a tropical depression formed from the remnants of Tropical Depression Marilyn east of Batanes. PAGASA later named the tropical cyclone as "Nimfa", as the JTWC issued a medium warning for Nimfa. Tropical Depression Nimfa was later given a Tropical Cyclone Formation Alert but still classified it as a monsoon depression by JTWC. The JTWC later designated Nimfa as 18W. Tropical Depression Nimfa was upgraded by the Japan Meteorological Agency into a tropical storm, and was named Tapah. A non-warning tropical depression in the South China Sea merged with the circulation of Tapah on Thursday, September 19. Tapah still had a disorganized and mostly exposed center on September 19. Tapah later re-organized itself, and further intensified into a severe tropical storm.

Early morning on September 21 (PST), Tapah exited the PAR, and then the PAGASA gave its last advisory on it. It even intensified further as it passed the Ryukyu Islands. Tapah then intensified into a typhoon as per the JMA, Tapah weakened into a severe tropical storm, as its diameter explosively expanded. Tapah then rapidly weakened into an extratropical storm on 00:00 UTC of September 23.

During the passage of Tapah, three people were killed in Japan, and the agricultural damage were amounted to be ¥583 million (US$5.42 million). Damage in South Korea were at ₩2.96 billion (US$2.48 million). Though three deaths were reported during the storm, officials said that they were not related to Tapah.

=== Typhoon Mitag (Onyok) ===
- Typhoon (JMA)
- Category 2 typhoon (SSHWS)
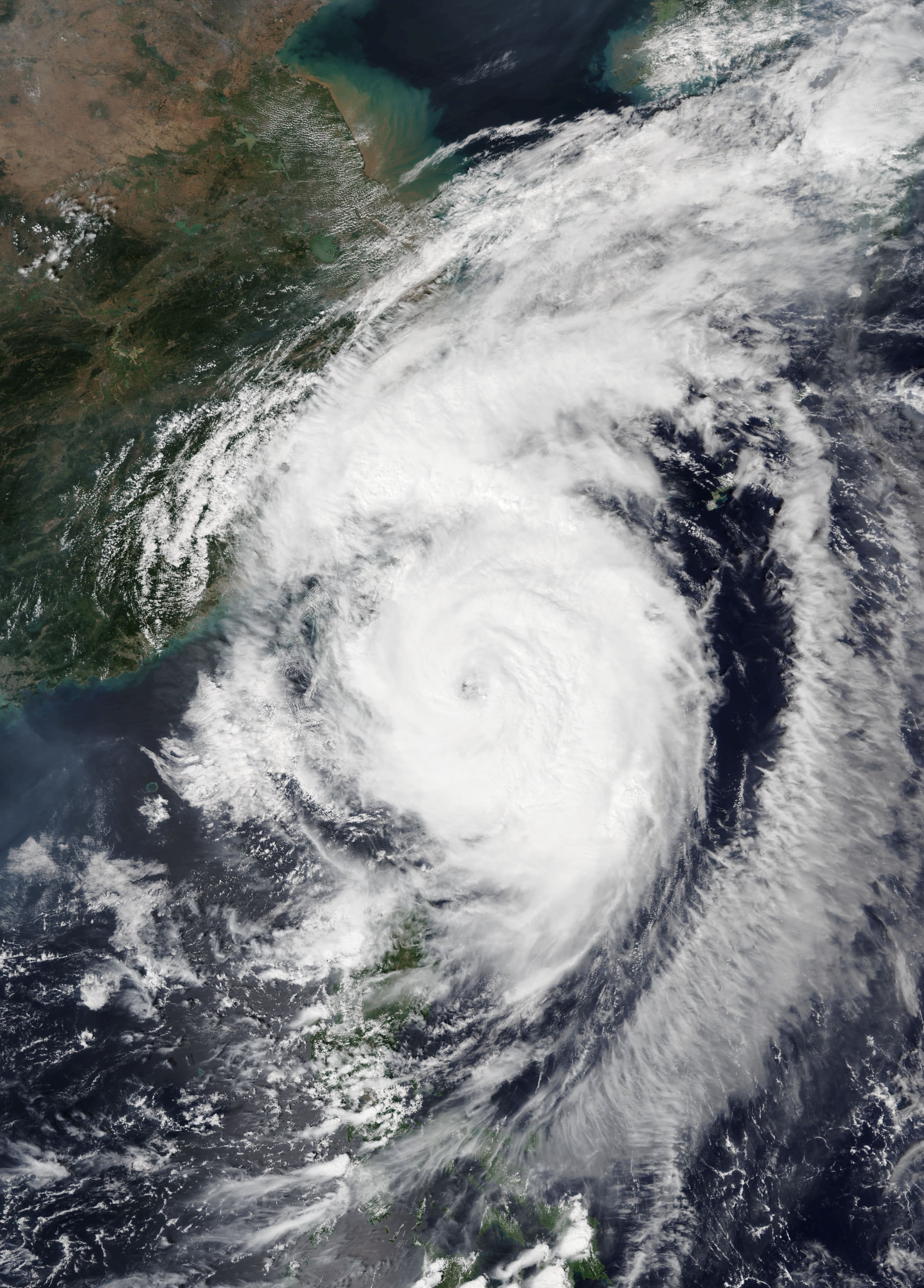
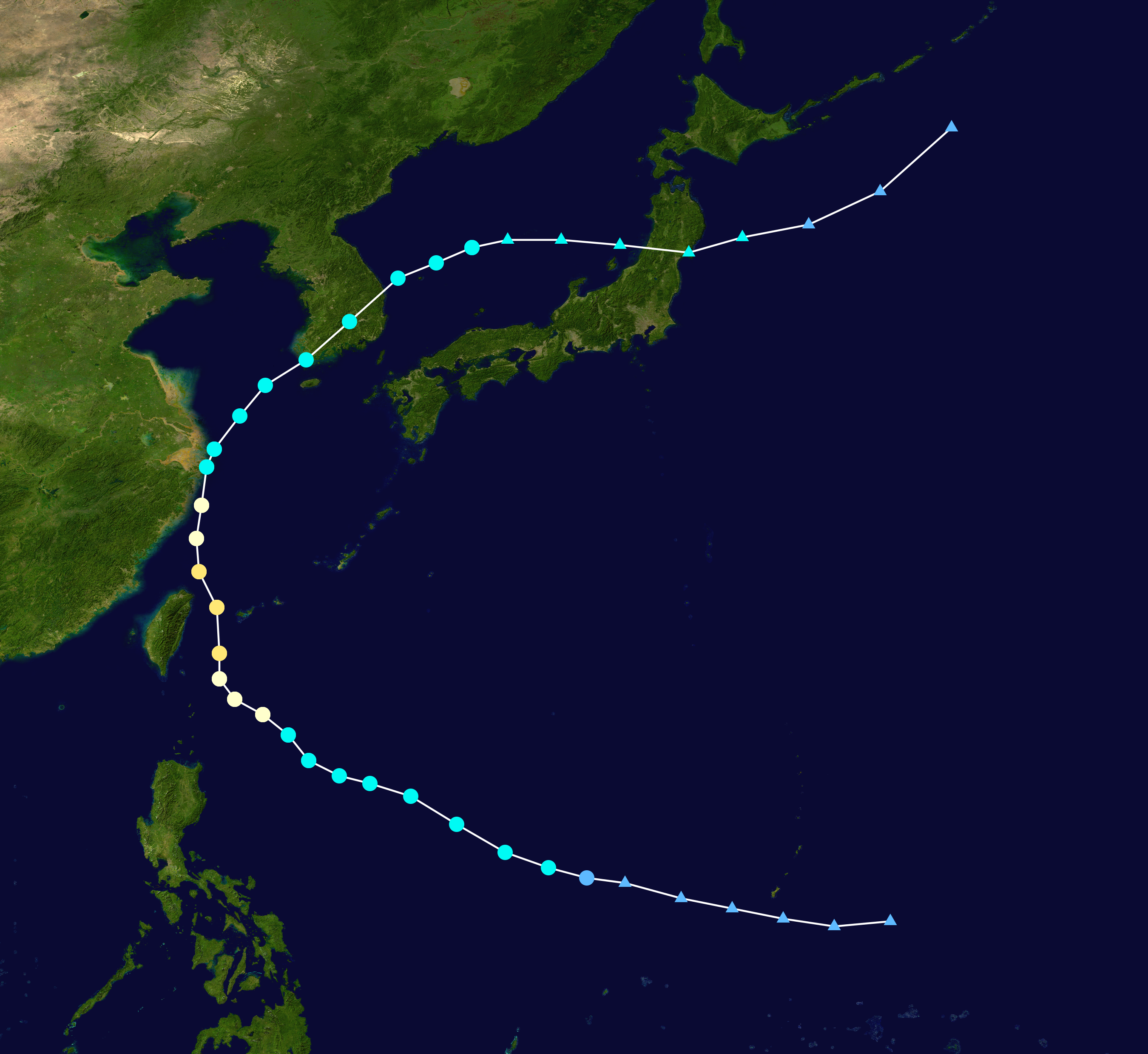
- Duration: September 24 – October 3
- Peak intensity: 140 km/h (85 mph) (10-min); 965 hPa (mbar)

A new low pressure system formed in the outer parts of the Western Pacific near the Micronesia Islands near-mid September. The system gradually organized and the Japan Meteorological Agency upgraded it to a tropical depression on September 25. The Joint Typhoon Warning Center then issued a Tropical Cyclone Formation Alert on it. The JTWC later upgraded the system to a tropical depression and designated it 19W. The PAGASA named the system "Onyok" as it entered the Philippine Area of Responsibility, and the Joint Typhoon Warning Center upgraded it to Tropical Storm Onyok. On September 28, the Japan Meteorological Agency upgraded Onyok to a tropical storm, and named it Mitag. Mitag began to organize itself, clearly forming a visible circulation while it was east of Luzon. Later that day the JMA upgraded Mitag to a severe tropical storm. Mitag further strengthened into a typhoon by September 29.

Mitag then further intensified, becoming a Category 2 typhoon by evening on September 30, with a small eye developed. On October 1, Mitag weakened below typhoon intensity, before making landfall in Zhoushan, Zhejiang at 20:30 CST (12:30 UTC). On the next day, the storm made landfall on South Korea.

In Taiwan, 12 people were injured during the typhoon. The Nanfang'ao Bridge collapsed following the passage of Mitag, leaving six dead and 12 injured; the specific cause of the collapse is still being investigated. Agricultural damage in Yaeyama Islands were at JP¥84.41 million (US$781,000). In Zhoushan, three people were killed, and the economic loss reached CN¥1.856 billion (US$260 million). Mitag also killed 13 people and left 2 missing in South Korea. Damage nationwide were amounted to be ₩181.9 billion (US$151 million).

=== Typhoon Hagibis ===
- Violent typhoon (JMA)
- Category 5 super typhoon (SSHWS)
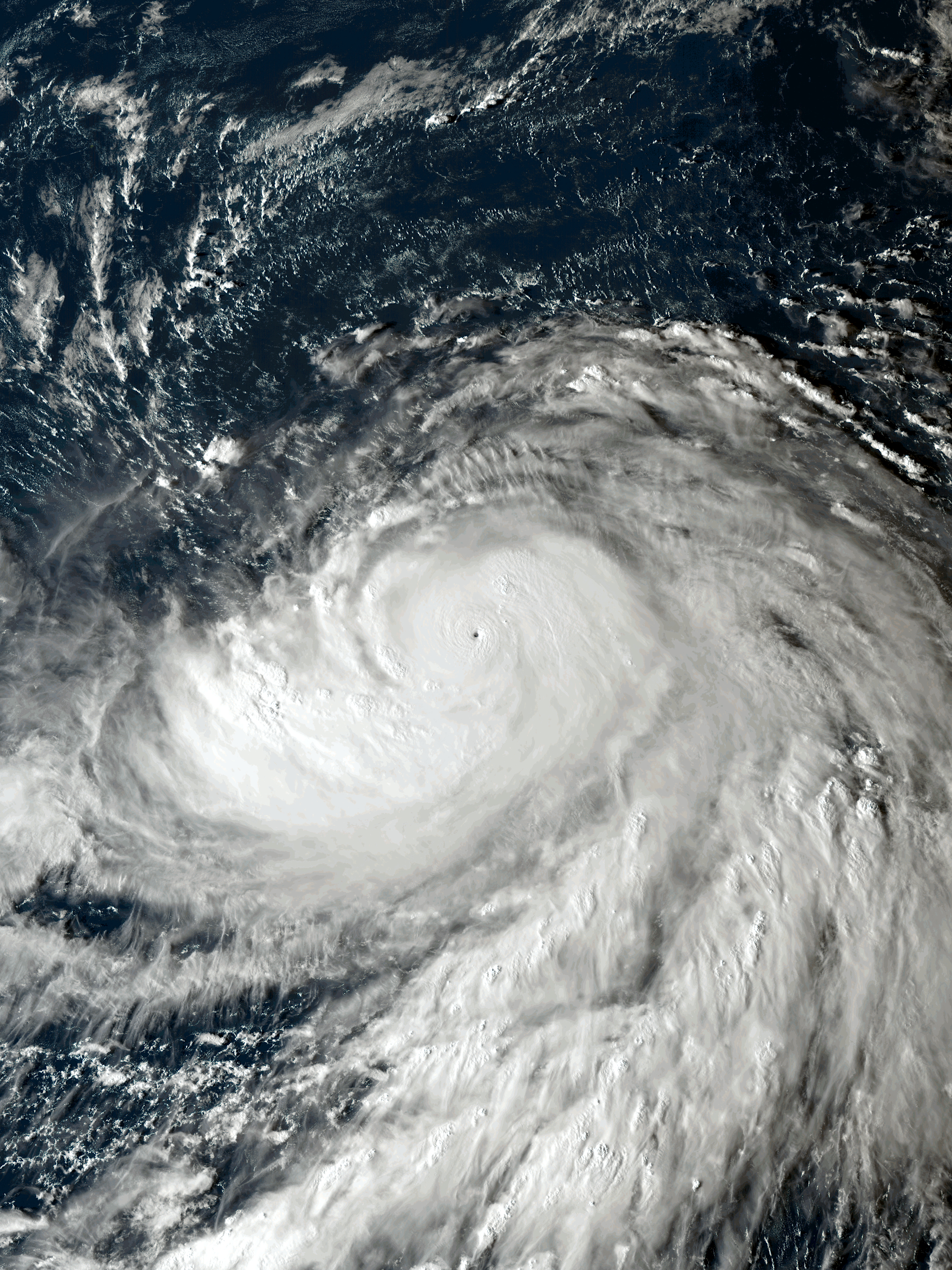
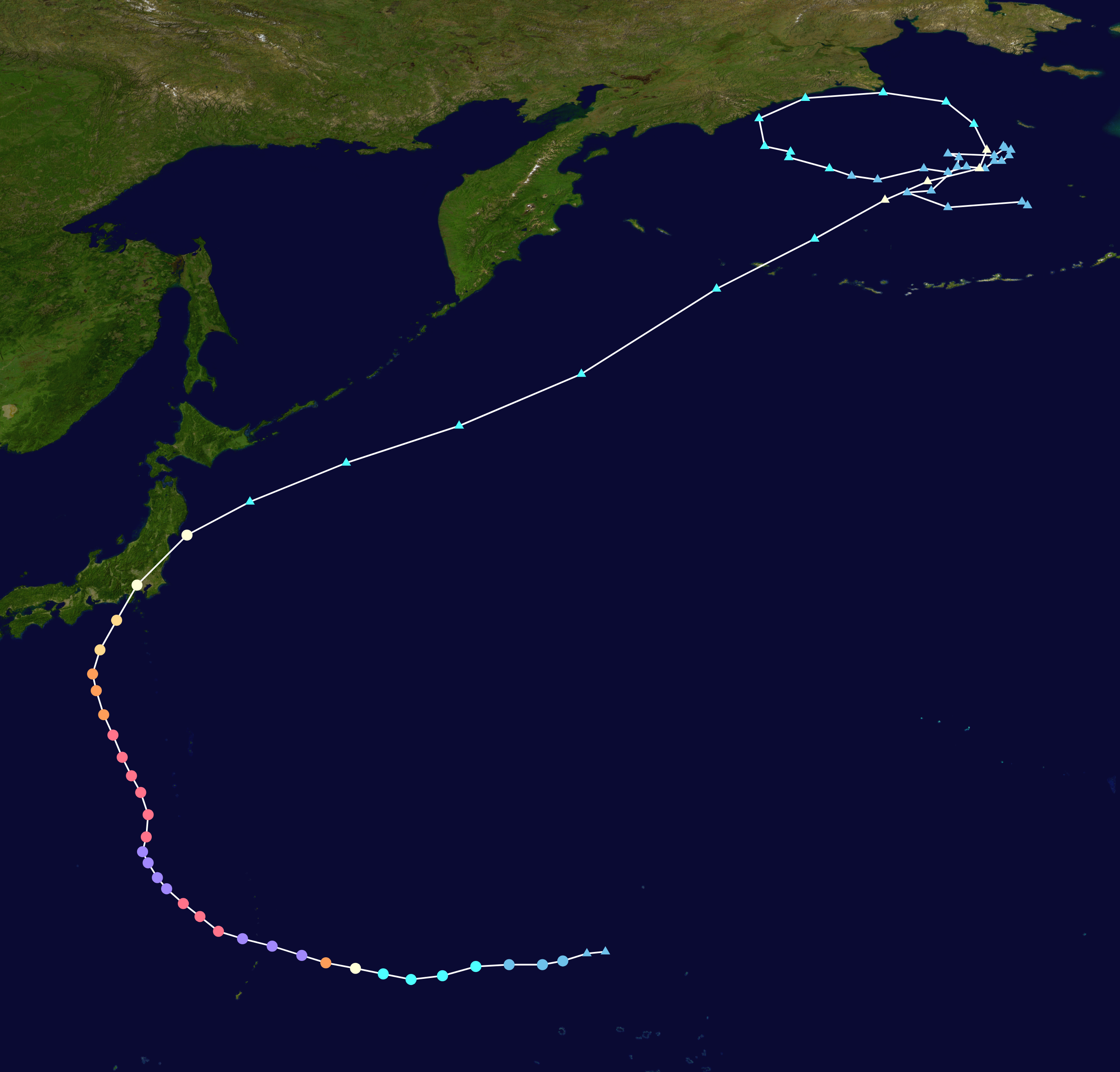
- Duration: October 4 – October 13
- Peak intensity: 195 km/h (120 mph) (10-min); 915 hPa (mbar)

On October 2, the Joint Typhoon Warning Center began monitoring a tropical disturbance that was situated north of the Marshall Islands. On the next day, the JTWC issued a Tropical Cyclone Formation Alert. On October 4, both the JTWC and the Japan Meteorological Agency began issuing advisories on Tropical Depression 20W.

On October 5, the depression rapidly intensified into a tropical storm, and was issued the name "Hagibis" by the JMA. Sea surface temperatures and low wind shear allowed Hagibis to strengthen further, and on October 6, Hagibis became a severe tropical storm. On October 7, while continuing to move west, Hagibis explosively intensified and became a super typhoon in the space of only a few hours, developing a pinhole eye. As it approached the uninhabited areas of the Mariana Islands, strong convective activity as a result of extremely favourable conditions saw Hagibis became a very powerful Category 5-equivalent super typhoon on the Saffir-Simpson hurricane wind scale, with one-minute sustained wind speeds of 295 km/h (185 mph). The National Weather Service also began issuing advisories for its areas of responsibility, with a typhoon warning issued for Saipan and Tinian, and tropical storm advisories issued for Sinapalo and Hagåtña. Hagibis passed over the Mariana Islands at 15:30 UTC on October 7 at peak intensity, with 10-minute sustained winds of 195 km/h (120 mph) and a central pressure of 915 hPa (27.02 inHg).

After passing the Mariana Islands, Hagibis began an eyewall replacement cycle, which caused the rapid intensification phase to end. As the primary eyewall began to erode, the typhoon weakened to a high-end Category 4-equivalent super typhoon at 00:00 UTC on October 8. Several hours later, Hagibis re-intensified into a Category 5-equivalent system upon completing the eyewall replacement cycle. Hagibis began to weaken on October 10. Hagibis made landfall on the Izu Peninsula of southeastern Honshu just after 09:00 UTC on October 12. Upon crossing the coast, the system had 10-minute sustained winds of 150 km/h (90 mph) and one-minute sustained winds of 155 km/h (100 mph), equivalent to a Category 2 hurricane.

By 13:30 UTC on October 10, the expected impacts in parts of Japan were such that the organisers of the 2019 Rugby World Cup decided to cancel at least two matches scheduled to be played over the weekend. On October 12 a third match was cancelled Japan Rail, Japan Airlines, and All Nippon Airways all announced suspended services.

On October 11, Formula One announced that they are cancelling all Saturday planned events that were initially scheduled as part of the 2019 Japanese Grand Prix. This includes the third practice session and qualifying, the latter of which was rescheduled to take place on Sunday morning, a few hours before the race. The F4 Japanese Championship had previously announced the previous day that they will be cancelling the double header round at Suzuka that was initially scheduled to take place as a supporting event for the Japanese Grand Prix.

=== Typhoon Neoguri (Perla) ===
- Typhoon (JMA)
- Category 2 typhoon (SSHWS)
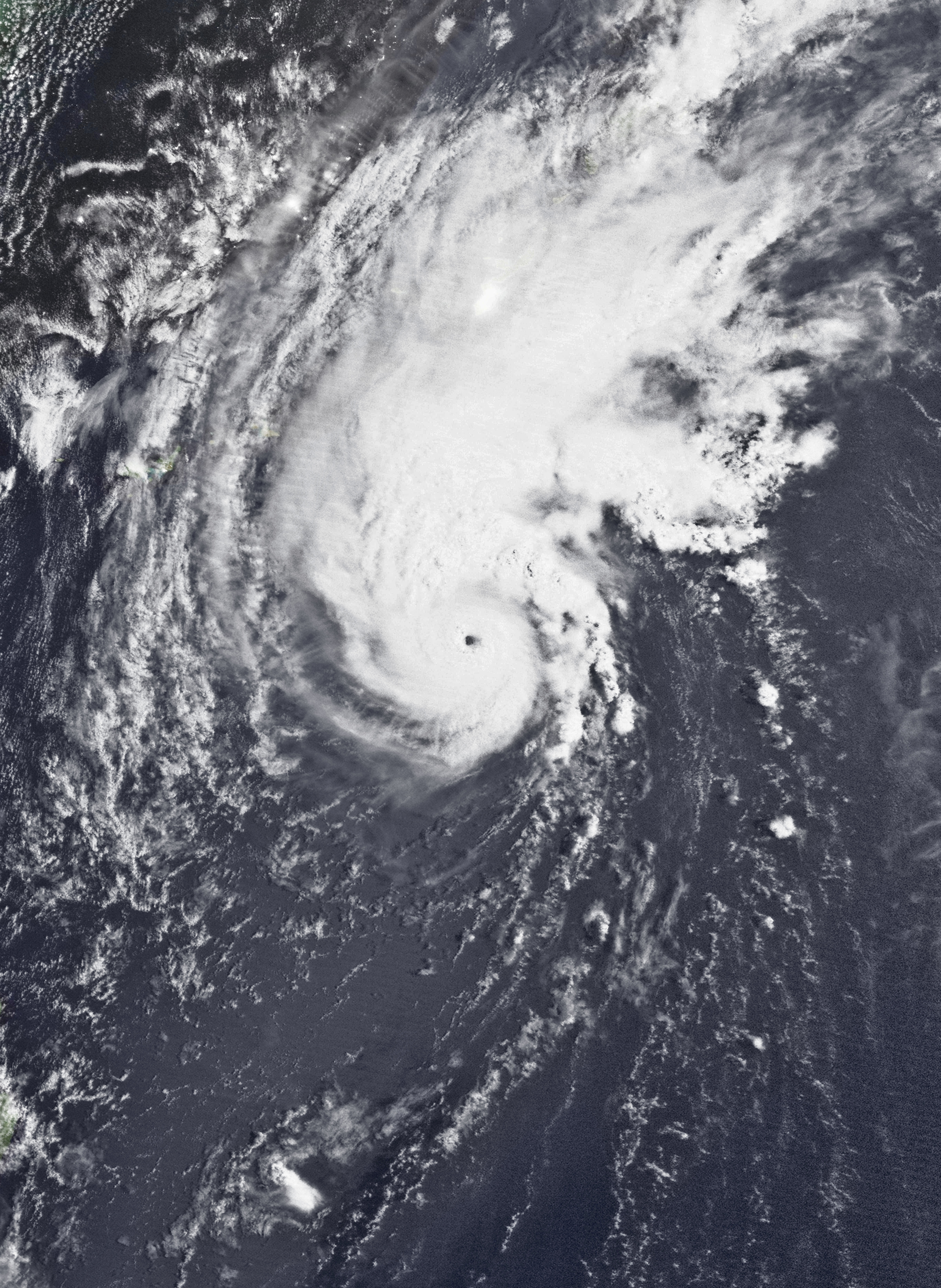
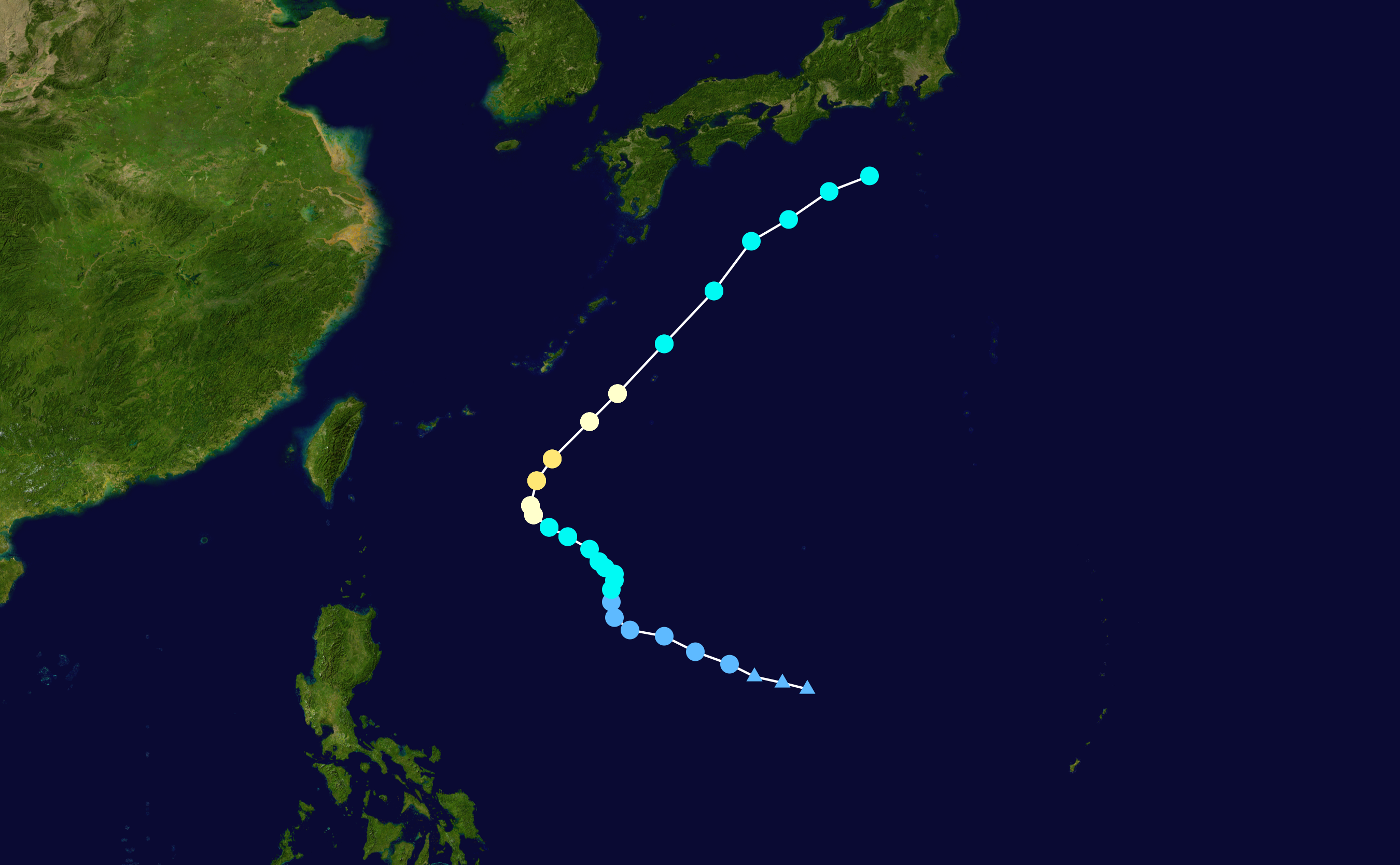
- Duration: October 15 – October 21
- Peak intensity: 140 km/h (85 mph) (10-min); 970 hPa (mbar)

On October 15, a tropical depression formed in the West Pacific. The depression slowly intensified and was eventually given the name Perla by PAGASA. The depression strengthened into Tropical Storm Neoguri, late on October 17. By 12:00 UTC on October 19, Neoguri became a typhoon as it neared the Ryukyu Islands of Japan. Just 5 hours later, Neoguri reached its peak intensity as it began to pull to the northeast. Neoguri began to quickly weaken and made a transition into an extratropical cyclone to the south of Japan on October 21.

As Neoguri strengthened, it brought light rainstorms to the Batanes and Cagayan in the Philippines. As Neoguri brushed Japan, it dumped up to 9 inches of rainfall in the Tokyo Metro Area, which had already been drenched by Typhoon Hagibis earlier that month and Typhoon Faxai the month before.

=== Typhoon Bualoi ===
- Very strong typhoon (JMA)
- Category 5 super typhoon (SSHWS)
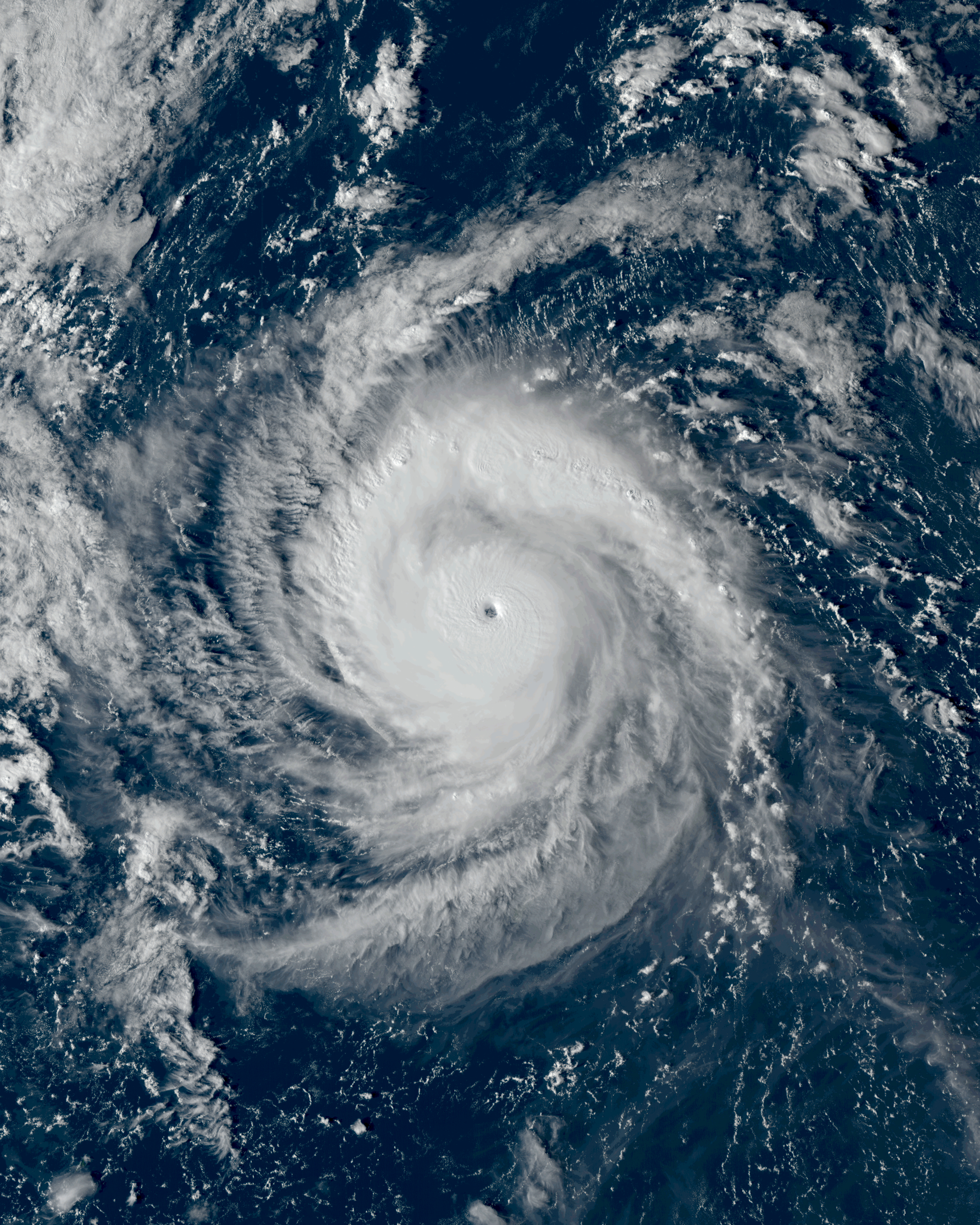
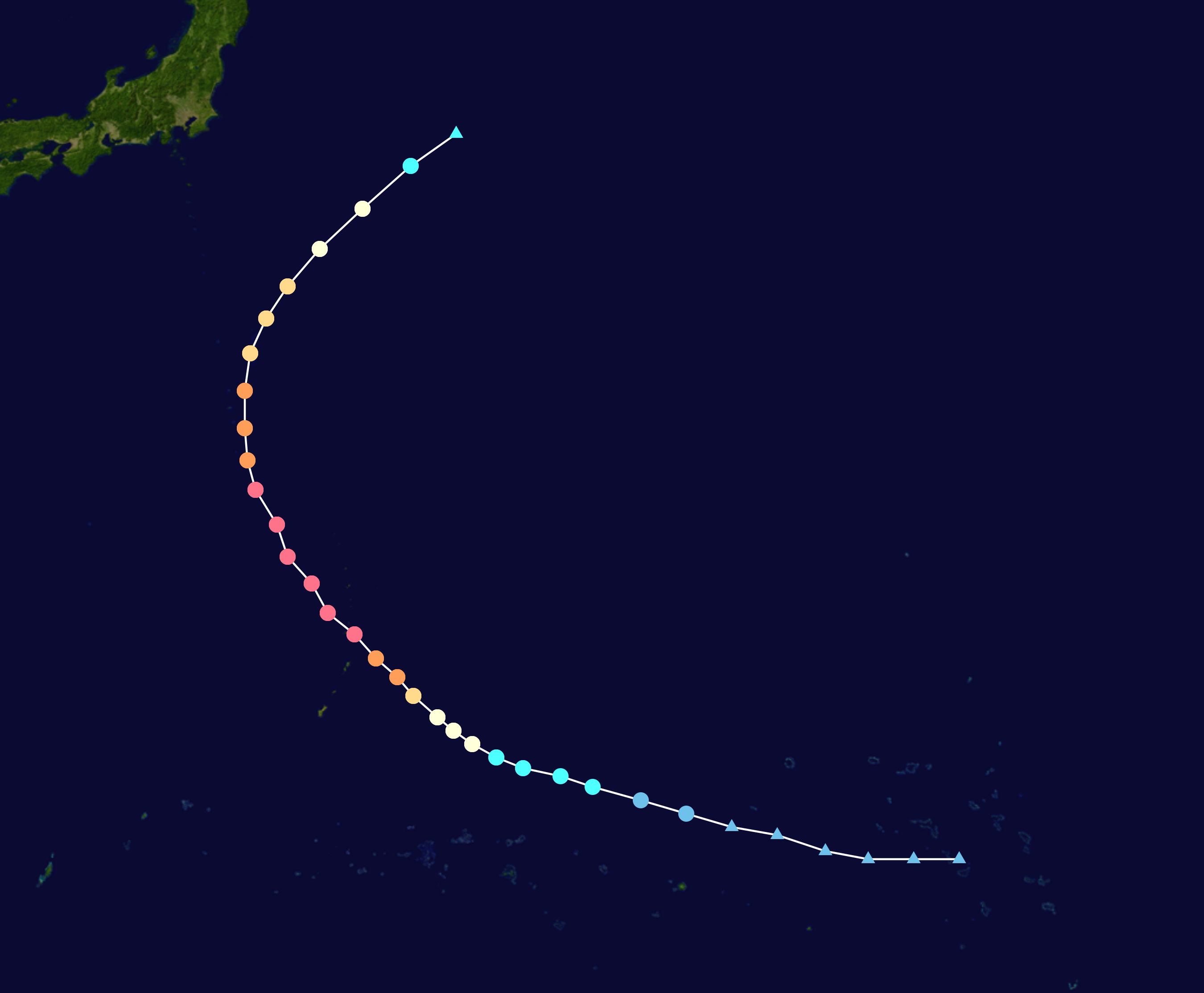
- Duration: October 18 – October 25
- Peak intensity: 185 km/h (115 mph) (10-min); 935 hPa (mbar)

On October 17, the Joint Typhoon Warning Center began monitoring a disturbance situated a couple hundred miles east of the Marshall Islands, and on October 19, the disturbance quickly organised into Tropical Depression 22W. Advisories began to be issued on the system as a conducive environment with very warm sea surface temperatures and low wind shear allowed 22W to strengthen. By October 19, it became Tropical Storm Bualoi and on the next day, it entered a period of rapid intensification. Bualoi quickly became a severe tropical storm and then a typhoon soon afterwards. The rate of strengthening slowed until October 21, at which point Bualoi became a Category 2-equivalent typhoon on the Saffir-Simpson hurricane wind scale. The system then recommenced its rapid intensification, strengthening to Category 3 six hours later, and proceeded to steadily intensify further to Category 4 later the same day. Bualoi reached its peak intensity on October 22, with 10-minute sustained winds of 185 km/h (115 mph) and one-minute sustained winds of 260 km/h (160 mph), equivalent to a Category 5 major hurricane. The system began to rapidly weaken the following day, dropping to a category 3-equivalent typhoon.

=== Severe Tropical Storm Matmo ===
- Severe tropical storm (JMA)
- Tropical storm (SSHWS)
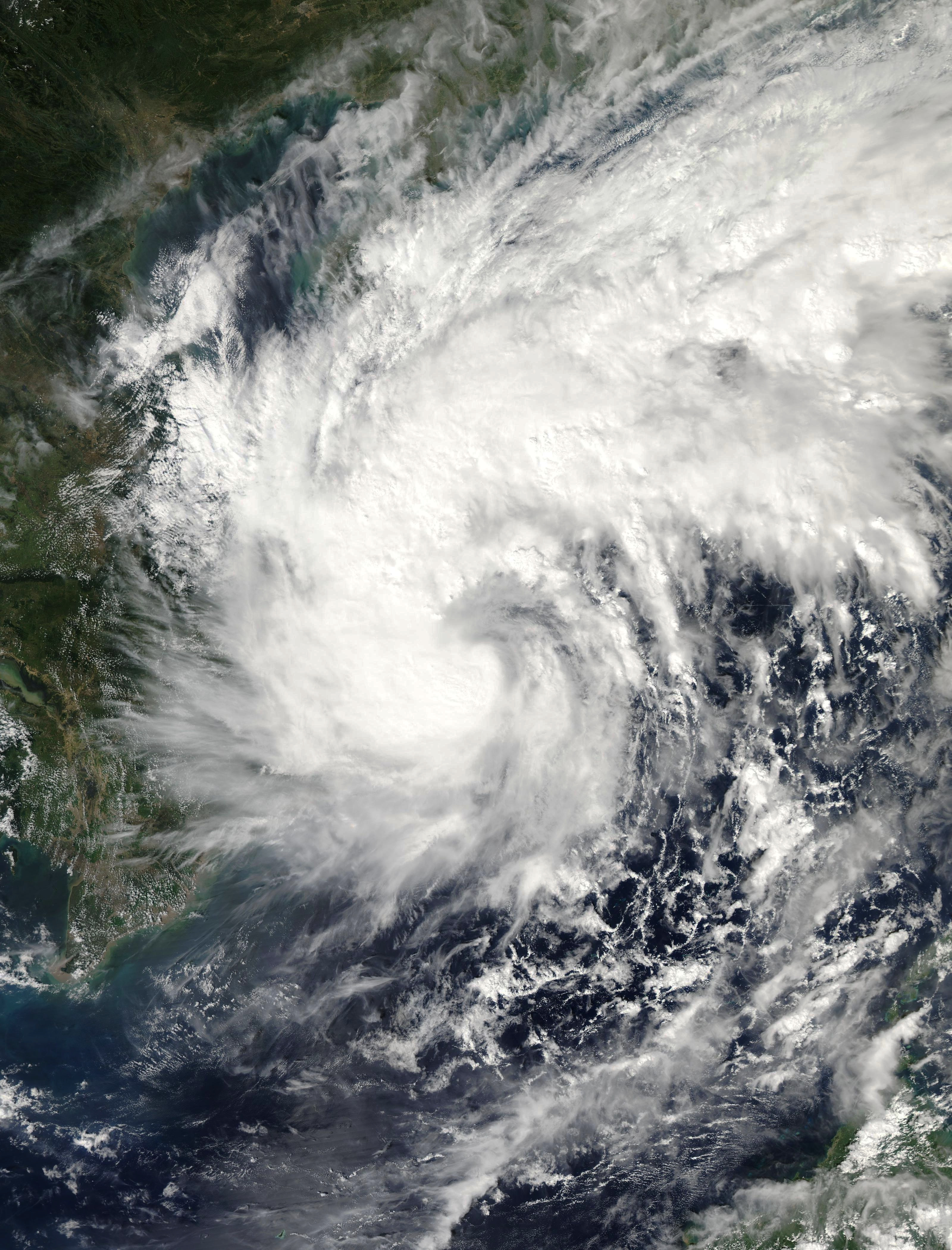
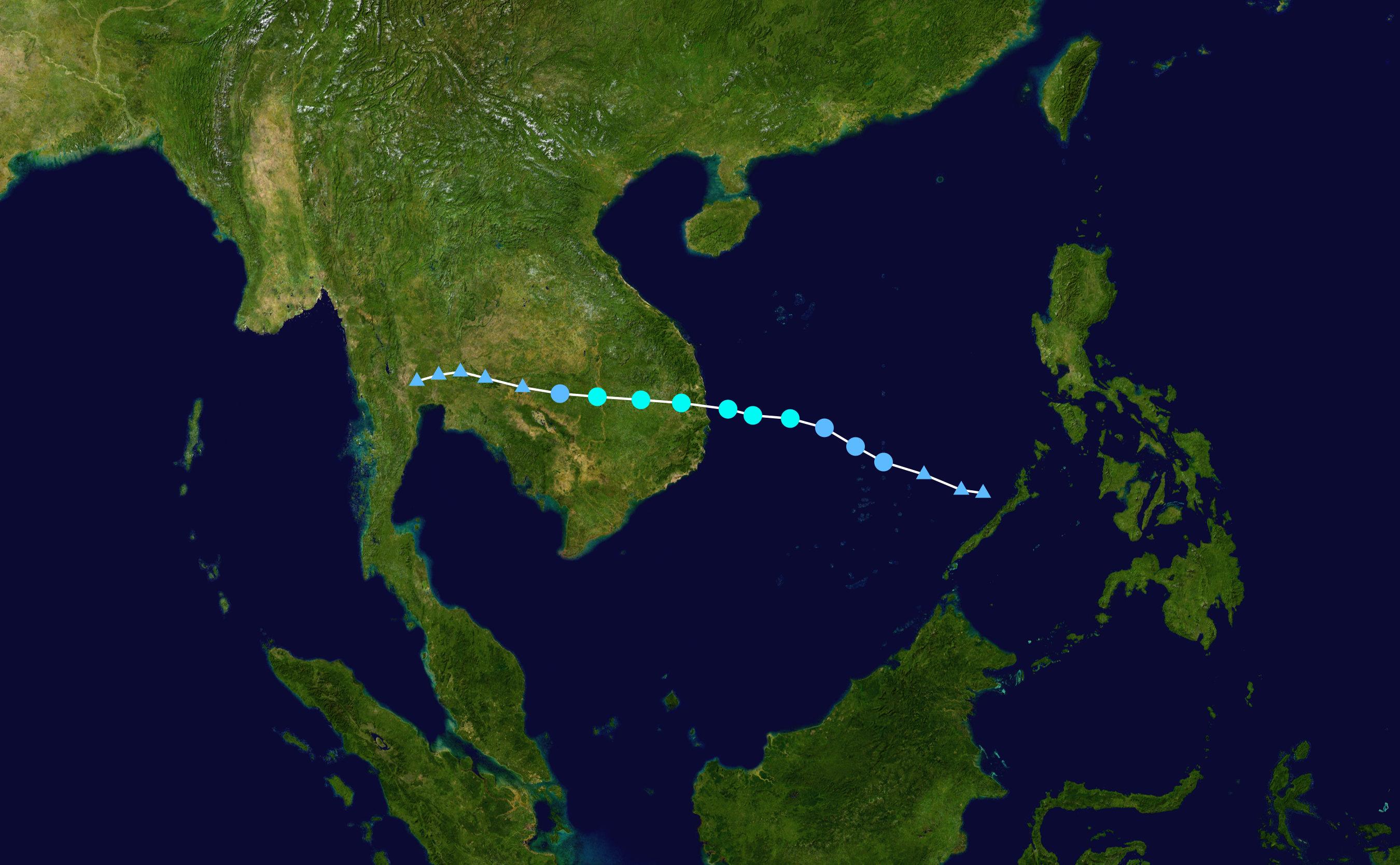
- Duration: October 28 – October 31
- Peak intensity: 95 km/h (60 mph) (10-min); 992 hPa (mbar)

A tropical depression formed near Palawan on October 28 and made landfall in Vietnam on October 30 as it intensified to a tropical storm and was named "Matmo". The storm brought rainfall to Cambodia and Thailand, while the heaviest rainfall occurred in Vietnam, causing flooding and road closures. The storm quickly weakened to tropical depression status and dissipated, with its remnants later emerging into the North Indian Ocean on November 2. The remnants soon redeveloped into a depression on November 5, which later became Cyclone Bulbul.

Matmo destroyed 2,700 houses and 35 schools, causing 3.8 billion VND (US$165 million) in damage in Vietnam, with majority of losses in two provinces: Quảng Ngãi and Bình Định. The storm also killed two people in the country.

=== Typhoon Halong ===
- Violent typhoon (JMA)
- Category 5 super typhoon (SSHWS)
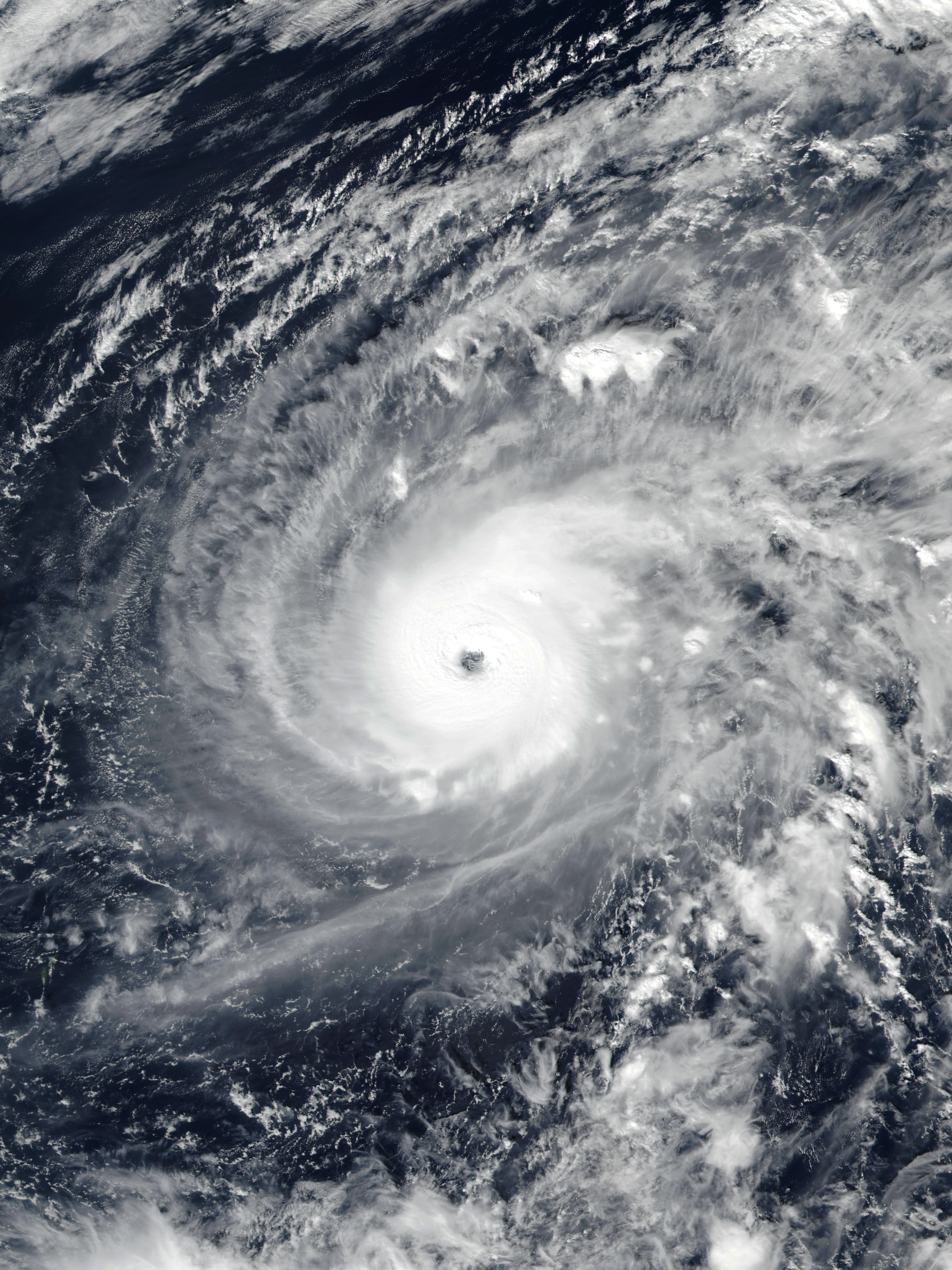
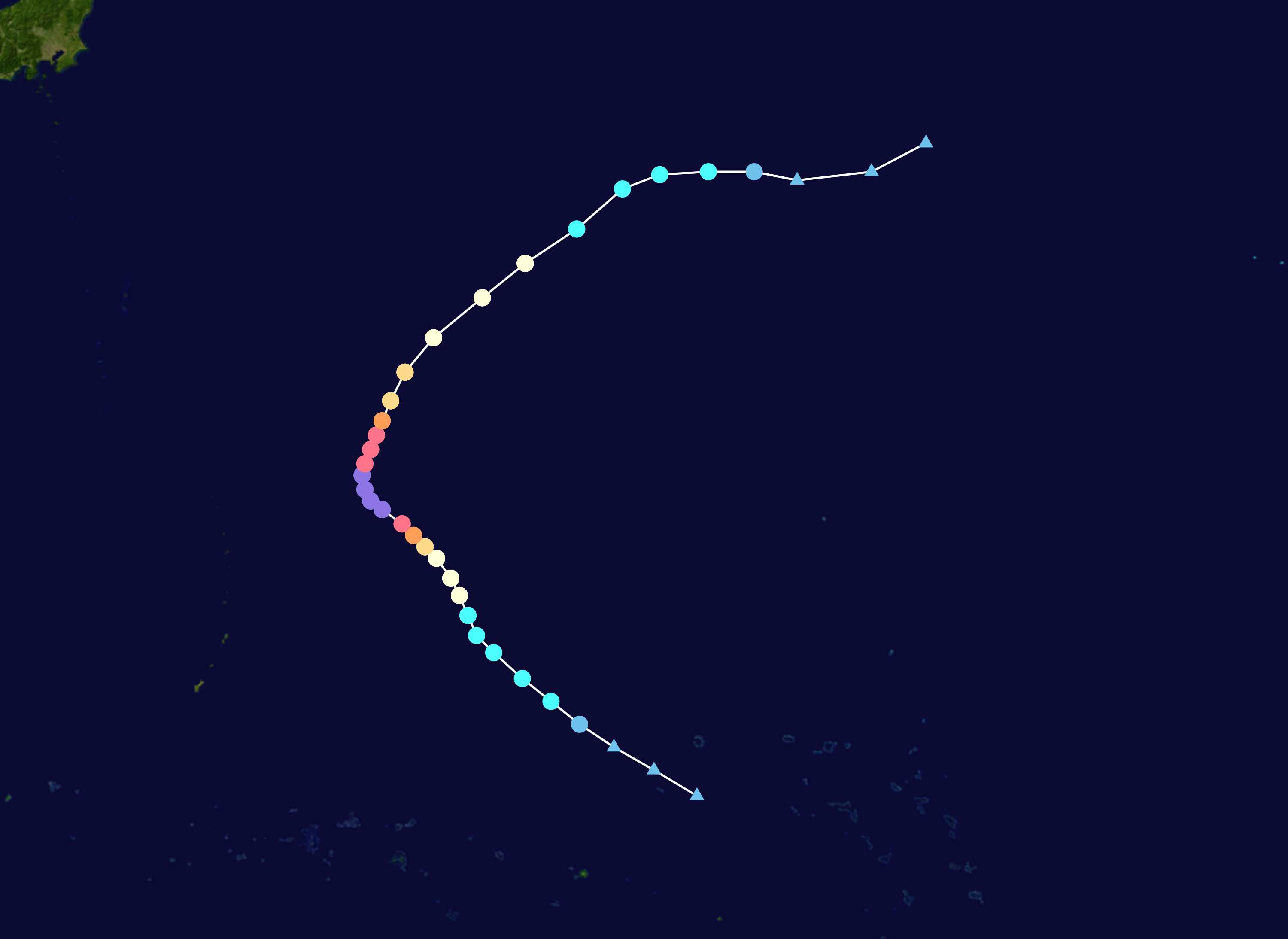
- Duration: November 1 – November 8
- Peak intensity: 215 km/h (130 mph) (10-min); 905 hPa (mbar)

On November 2, a well-organized low pressure system rapidly organized into a tropical depression several hundred miles east of the Northern Mariana Islands. The depression strengthened quickly and was upgraded to Tropical Storm Halong the same day. The storm continued strengthening over the open waters, reaching typhoon status. As Halong cleared out its eye, explosive intensification ensued on November 4, and Halong became a Category 5-equivalent super typhoon on November 5. Halong reached its peak intensity as the strongest storm of the 2019 season, with the JTWC estimating 1-minute sustained winds of 305 km/h (190 mph), the highest globally in 2019 and a minimum pressure of 888 hPa (mbar). On November 6, Halong began to undergo an eyewall replacement cycle and decreasing sea surface temperatures coupled with dry air intrusion began to take its toll on the system, and its circulation was heavily affected and it weakened to a Category 4-equivalent typhoon on 18:00 UTC. On November 8, Halong dropped below typhoon intensity, and finally became extratropical on the following day.

=== Typhoon Nakri (Quiel) ===
- Typhoon (JMA)
- Category 1 typhoon (SSHWS)
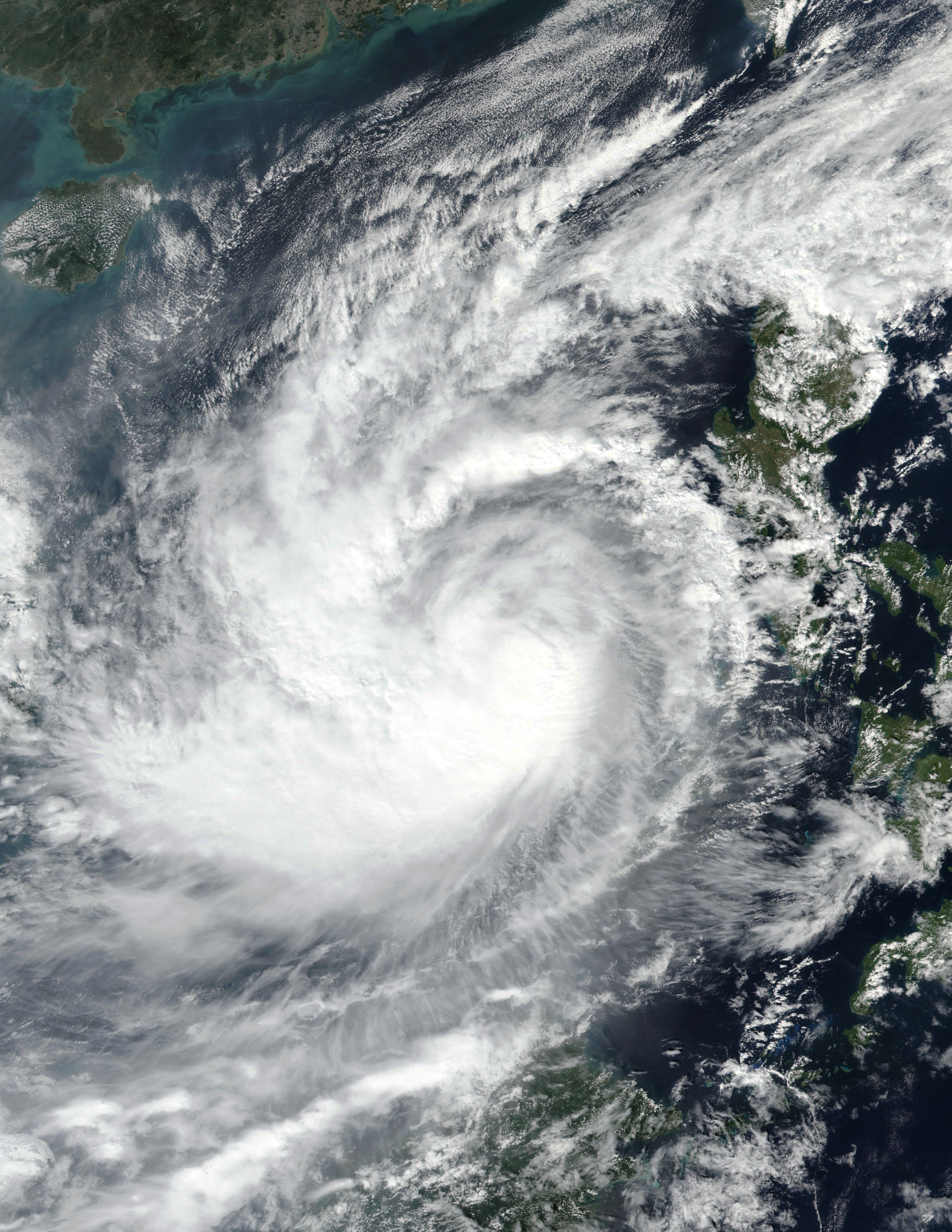
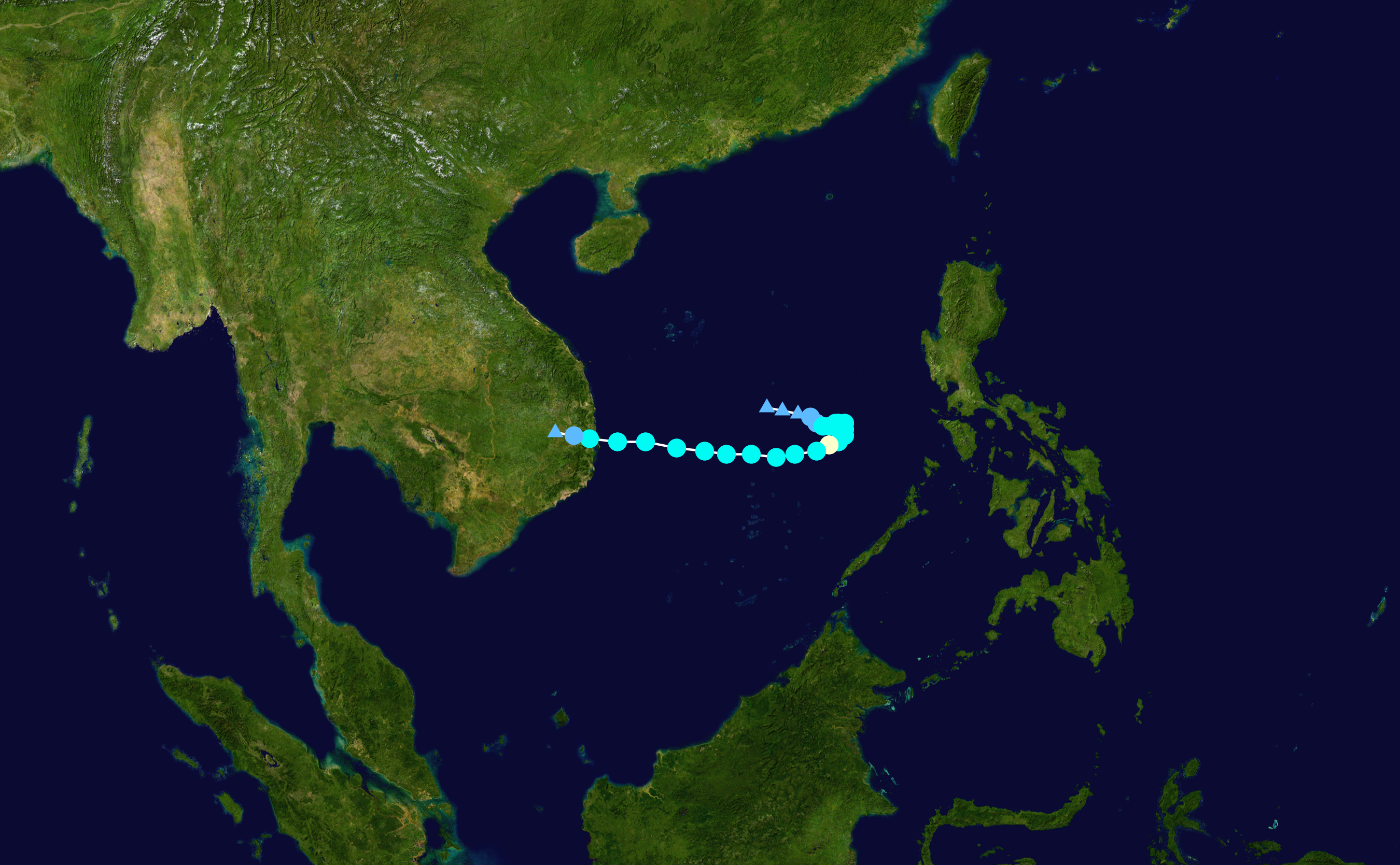
- Duration: November 4 – November 11
- Peak intensity: 120 km/h (75 mph) (10-min); 975 hPa (mbar)

On November 5, a depression off the coast of the Philippines developed into Tropical Depression Quiel. Quiel intensified to become the twenty-fourth tropical storm of the season and was named Nakri by JMA. Original forecasts showed it hitting Vietnam as a minor tropical storm, or a depression. However, on November 7, unexpected strengthening occurred, and the storm intensified into a typhoon. On November 9, Nakri began to weaken as it dropped below typhoon intensity because of the strong wind shear. It eventually crossed the Vietnamese coast on November 11.

In Luzon, the combined effects of Nakri and a cold front produced widespread heavy rain. The resulting floods and landslides killed 24 people and left 13 others missing. Cagayan Province alone suffered ₱1.8 billion (US$49.4 million) in damage. After making its final landfall, Nakri dropped heavy rainfall reaching 175 mm (6.9 in) in Ban Ma Thout, Vietnam.

=== Typhoon Fengshen ===
- Very strong typhoon (JMA)
- Category 4 typhoon (SSHWS)
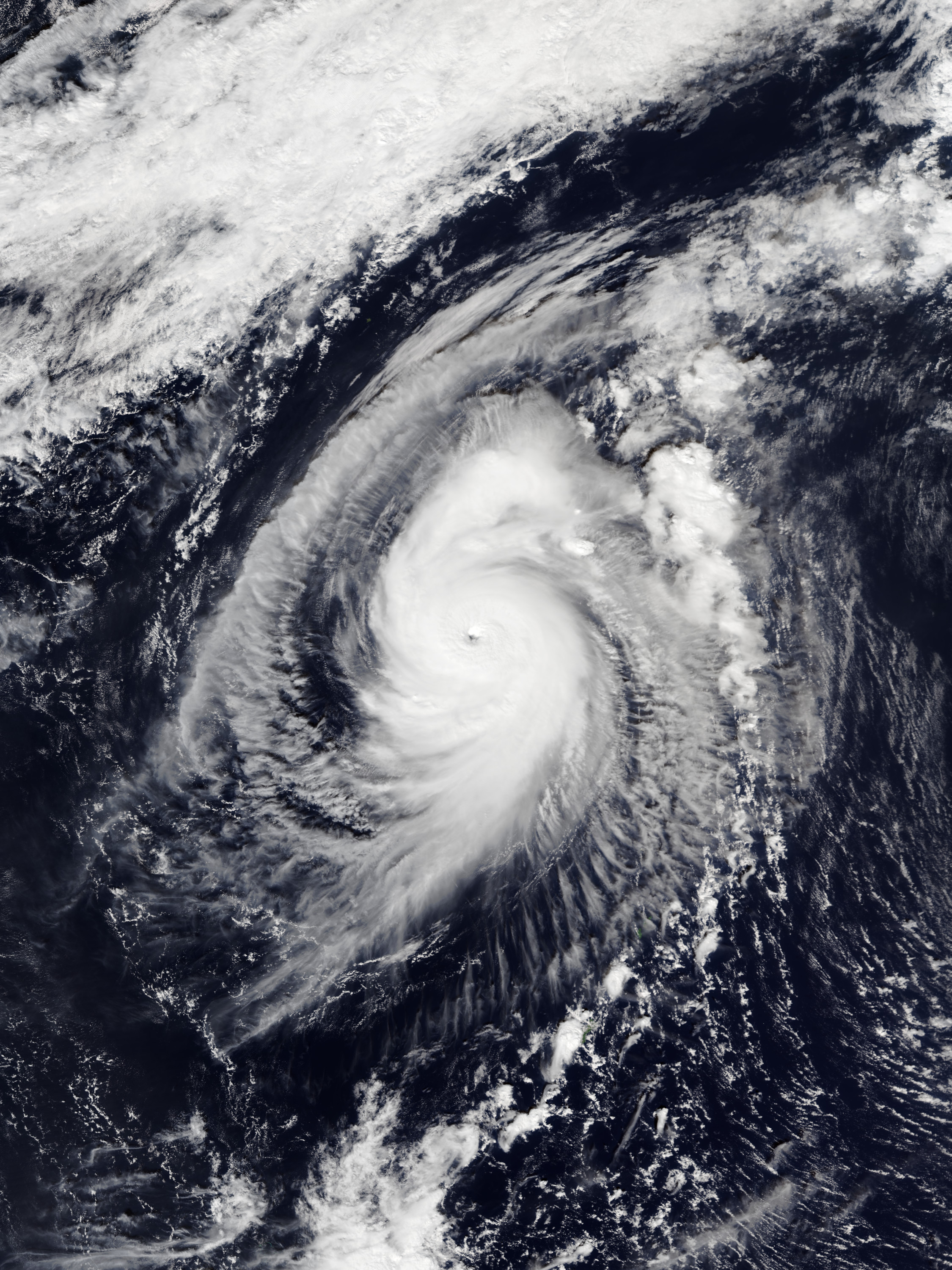
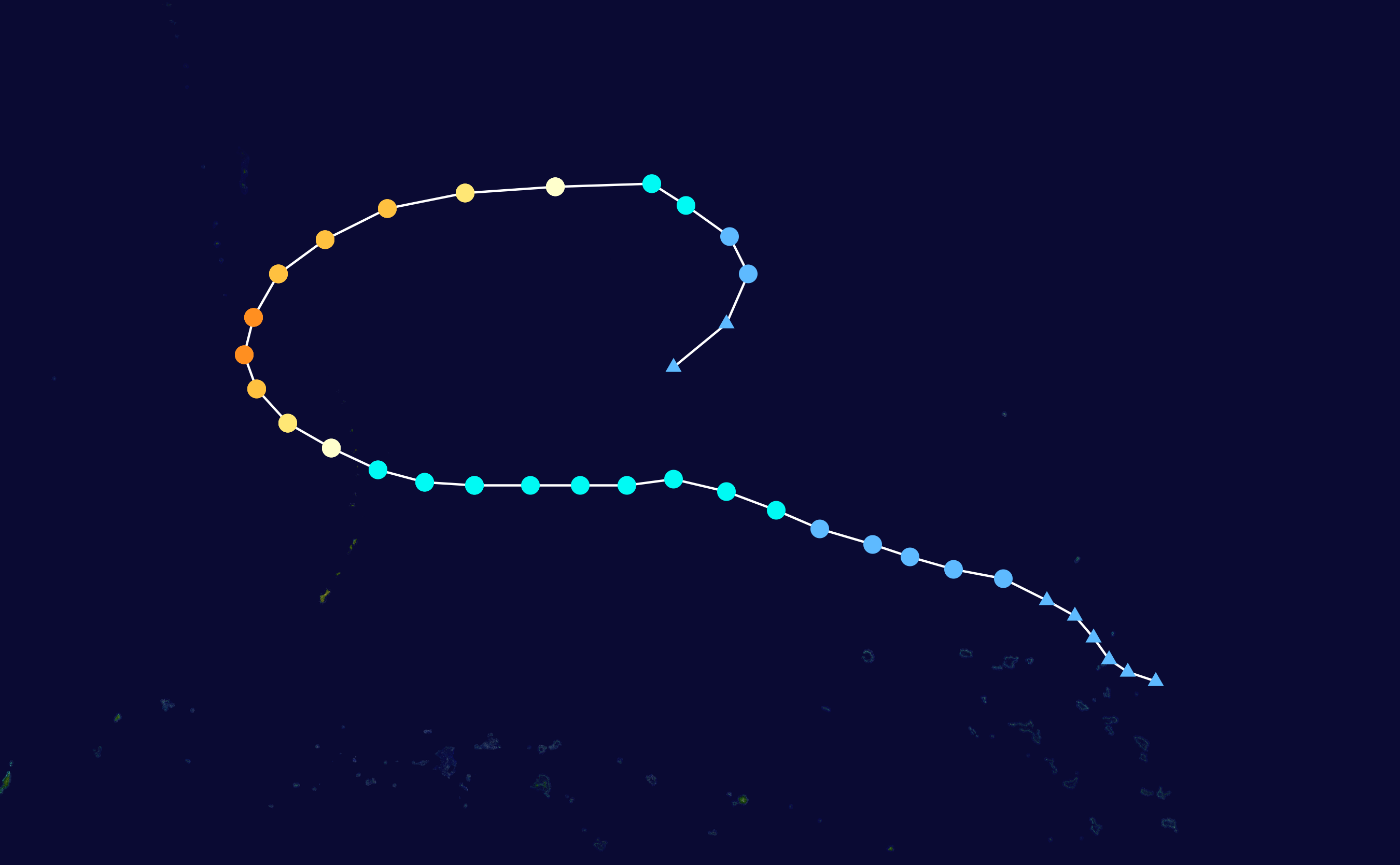
- Duration: November 9 – November 17
- Peak intensity: 155 km/h (100 mph) (10-min); 965 hPa (mbar)

On November 9, the Joint Typhoon Warning Center began monitoring a disturbance located in the open waters of the Western Pacific, several hundred miles east of the Mariana Islands. On November 10 the JTWC issued a tropical cyclone formation alert, and later that day, it developed into a tropical depression, prompting the JMA to give it the name "Fengshen". On November 12, the system slowly developed into a tropical storm as it continued to move westward. Over the next three days, Fengshen strengthened into a category 4 typhoon and showed a formative eye feature as it passed over the uninhabited area of the Marshall Islands, but on November 16, Fengshen began to be offset by vertical wind shear as it gained latitude and it began rapidly weakening.

=== Typhoon Kalmaegi (Ramon) ===
- Typhoon (JMA)
- Category 2 typhoon (SSHWS)
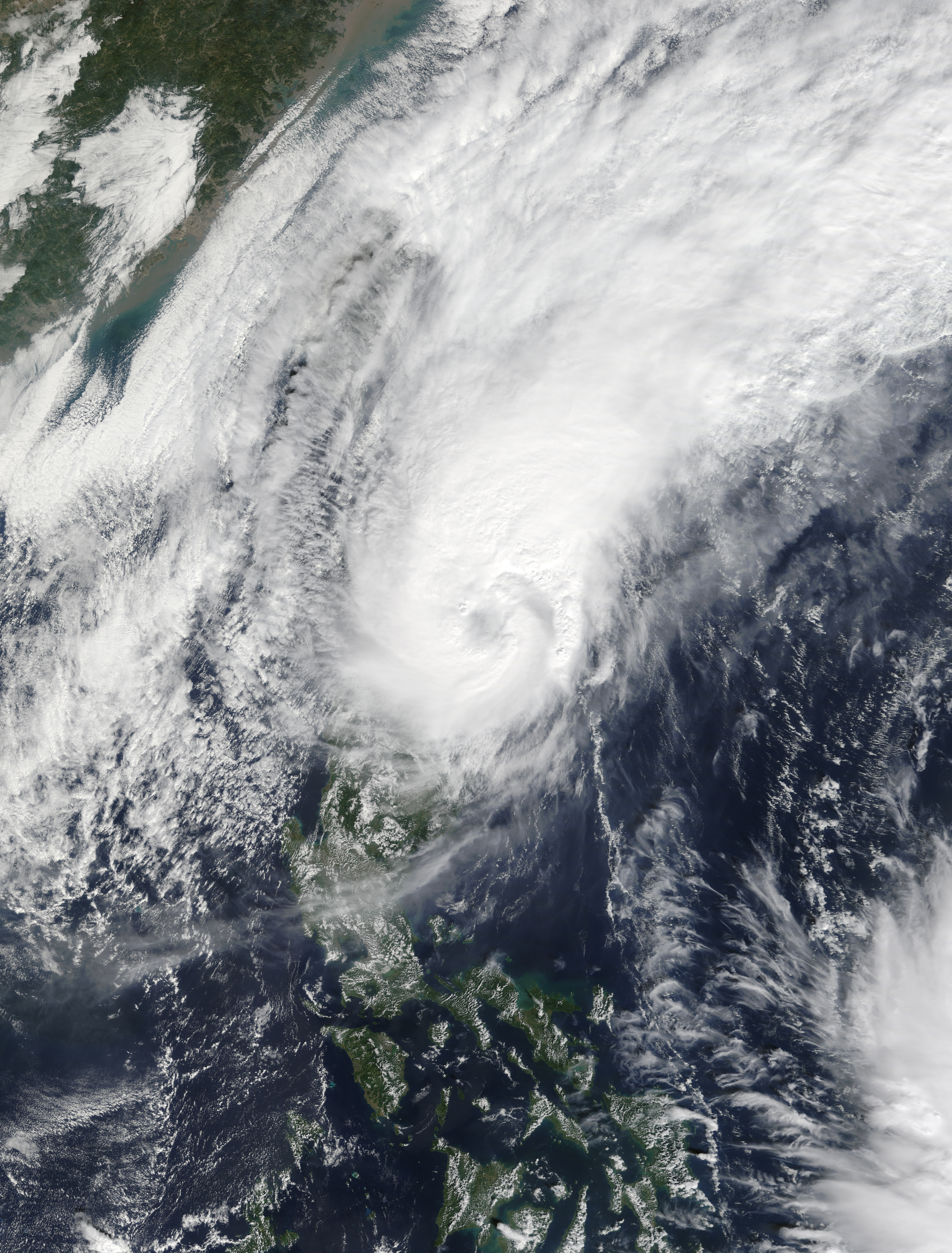
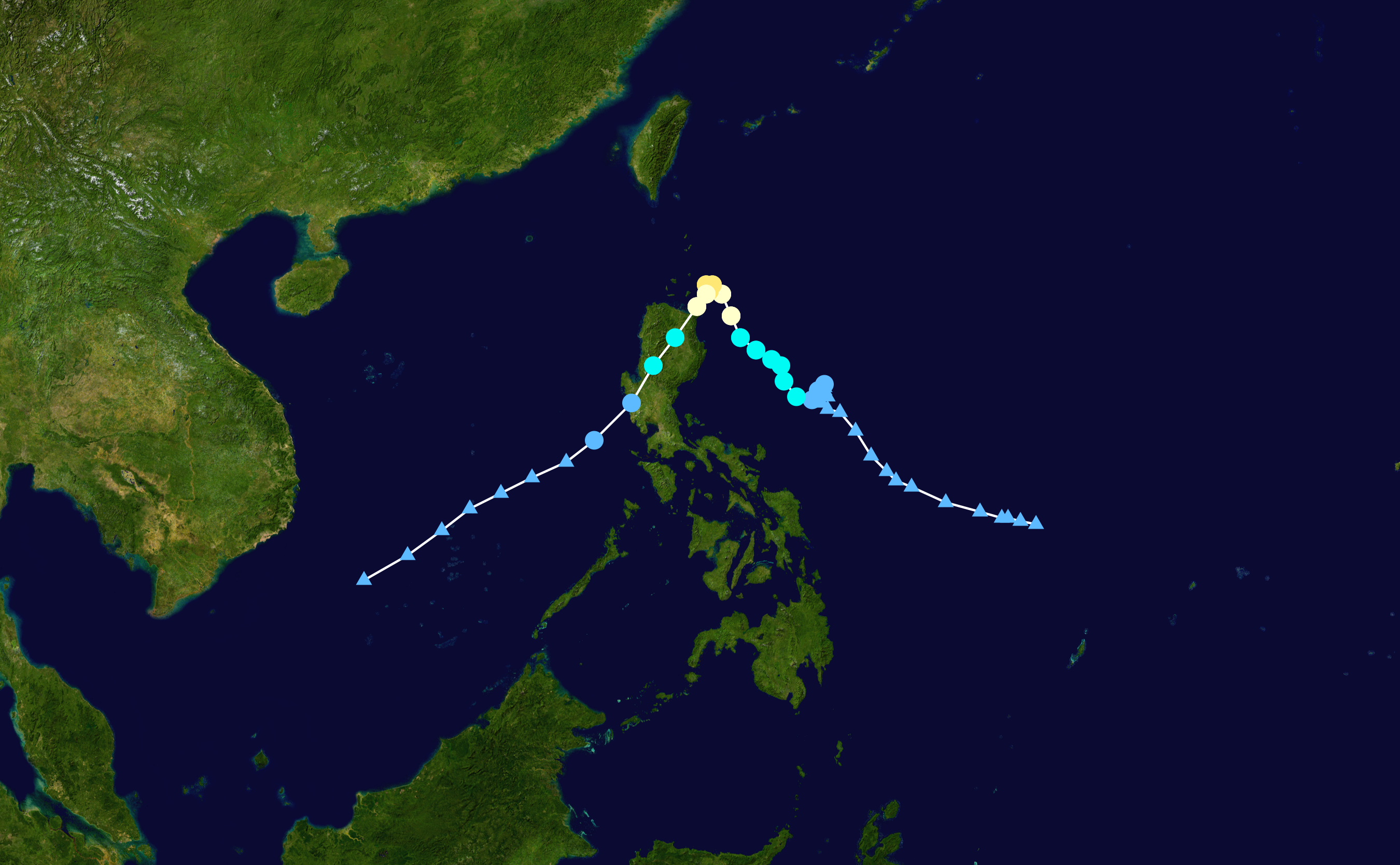
- Duration: November 9 – November 22
- Peak intensity: 130 km/h (80 mph) (10-min); 975 hPa (mbar)

On November 11, the Joint Typhoon Warning Center began monitoring a disturbance situated only a couple hundred miles off the coast of the Philippines. Despite initial models suggesting it would be short lived and move towards land, it quickly organized as sea surface temperatures became very conducive for development, and the JTWC issued a tropical cyclone formation alert late on November 11. Later, it developed into Tropical Depression 27W, and subsequently issued the name Ramon. Ramon intensified into a tropical storm by November 13, and was given the name Kalmaegi by the JMA. Up until November 16, Ramon appeared very disorganised as its low-level circulation center was exposed to high amounts of wind shear and dry air intrusion restricted any strengthening. On November 17, Kalmaegi entered favorable waters and then intensified into a severe tropical storm. By the next day, Kalmaegi intensified into a Category 1 typhoon, forecasted to hit the Ilocos region. On November 20, it hit Santa Ana, Cagayan instead of the Ilocos Region, and rapidly dissipated inland.

Across Cagayan Province, the storm caused ₱618.7 million (US$12.4 million) in damage.

=== Severe Tropical Storm Fung-wong (Sarah) ===
- Severe tropical storm (JMA)
- Category 1 typhoon (SSHWS)
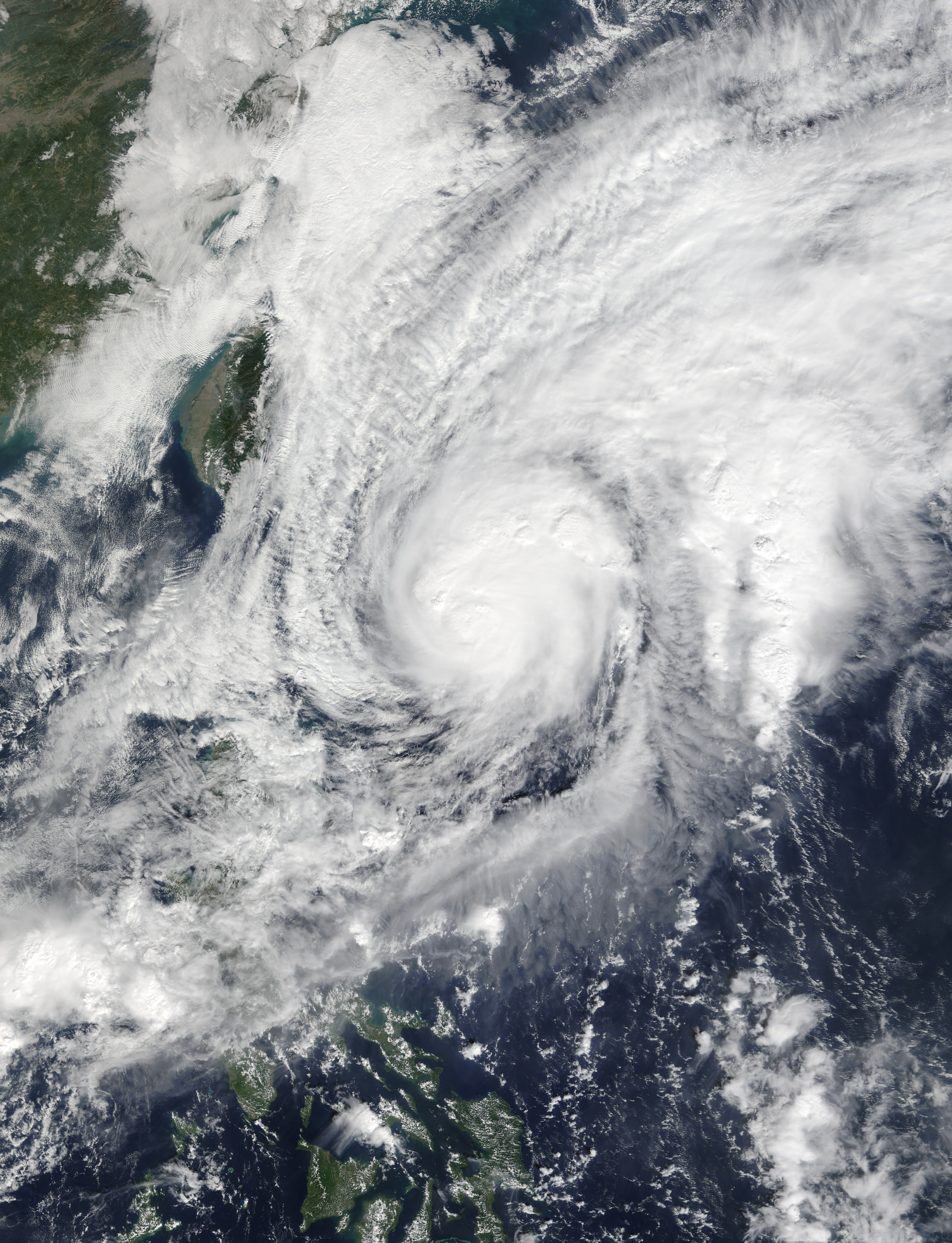
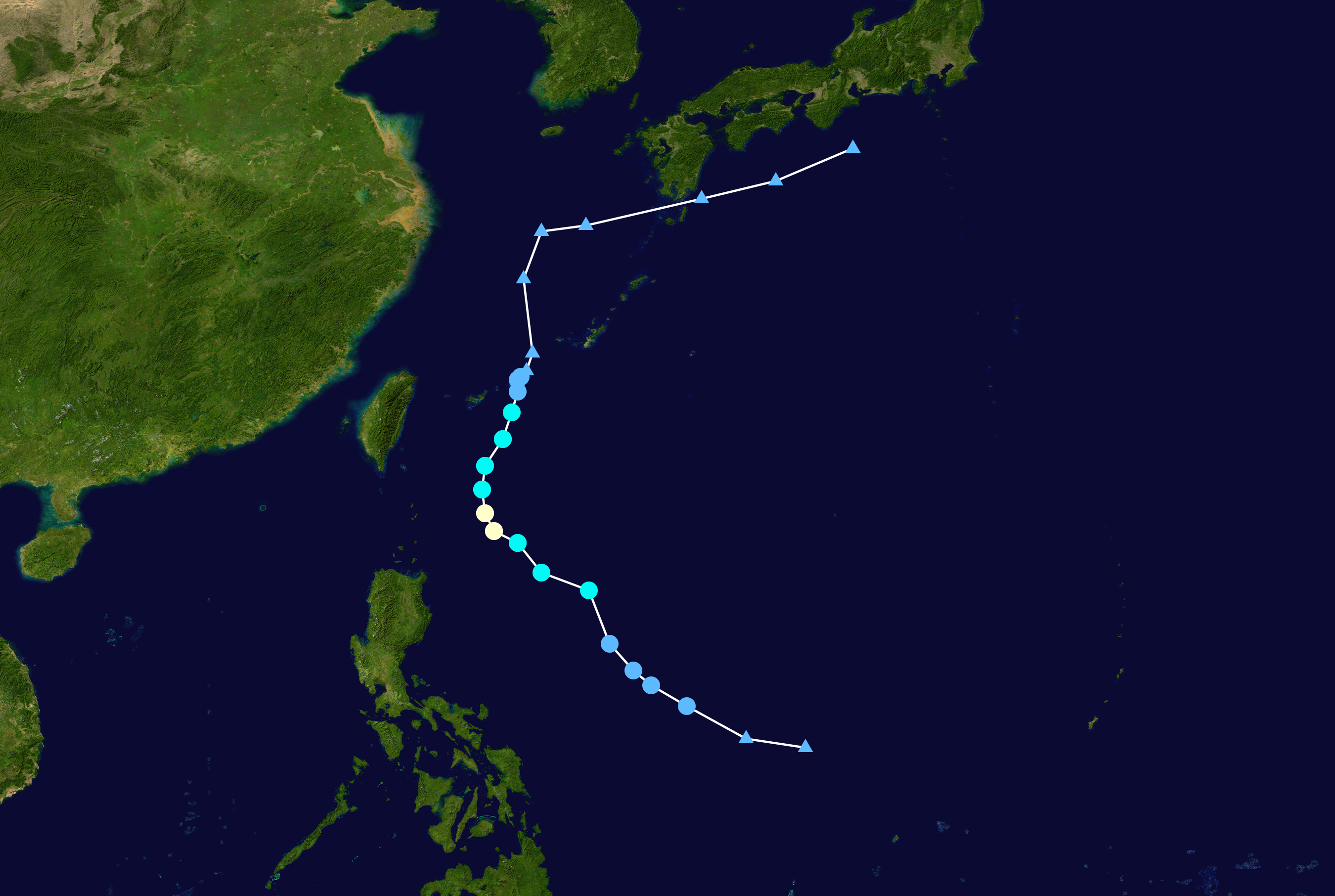
- Duration: November 17 – November 23
- Peak intensity: 100 km/h (65 mph) (10-min); 990 hPa (mbar)

A short-lived tropical cyclone was started as a tropical depression formed in November 18 from the Pacific waters off the Federated States of Micronesia as the Joint Typhoon Warning Center issued a TCFA for the system, designated as Tropical Depression 28W. By the next day, it entered the Philippine Area of Responsibility, assigned the PAGASA to name the storm as Sarah; the replacement for Sendong after its retirement in 2011. On November 19, Sarah intensified into a tropical storm, and was given the international name of Fung-wong (1927). Fung-wong then strengthened into a severe tropical storm east of Luzon the following day. The JTWC upgraded Fung-wong into a minimal Category 1 typhoon at 08:00 UTC. Soon, Fung-wong was hindered by northeasterly wind shear, and began to weaken rapidly while moving northeast, and dissipated into a remnant Low Pressure Area (LPA) west of Okinawa, Japan.

Although Fung-wong didn’t made landfall, in the Philippines, with its interaction with the shear line caused heavy rains over some parts of Cagayan Valley and Cordillera Administrative Region.

=== Typhoon Kammuri (Tisoy) ===
- Very strong typhoon (JMA)
- Category 4 typhoon (SSHWS)
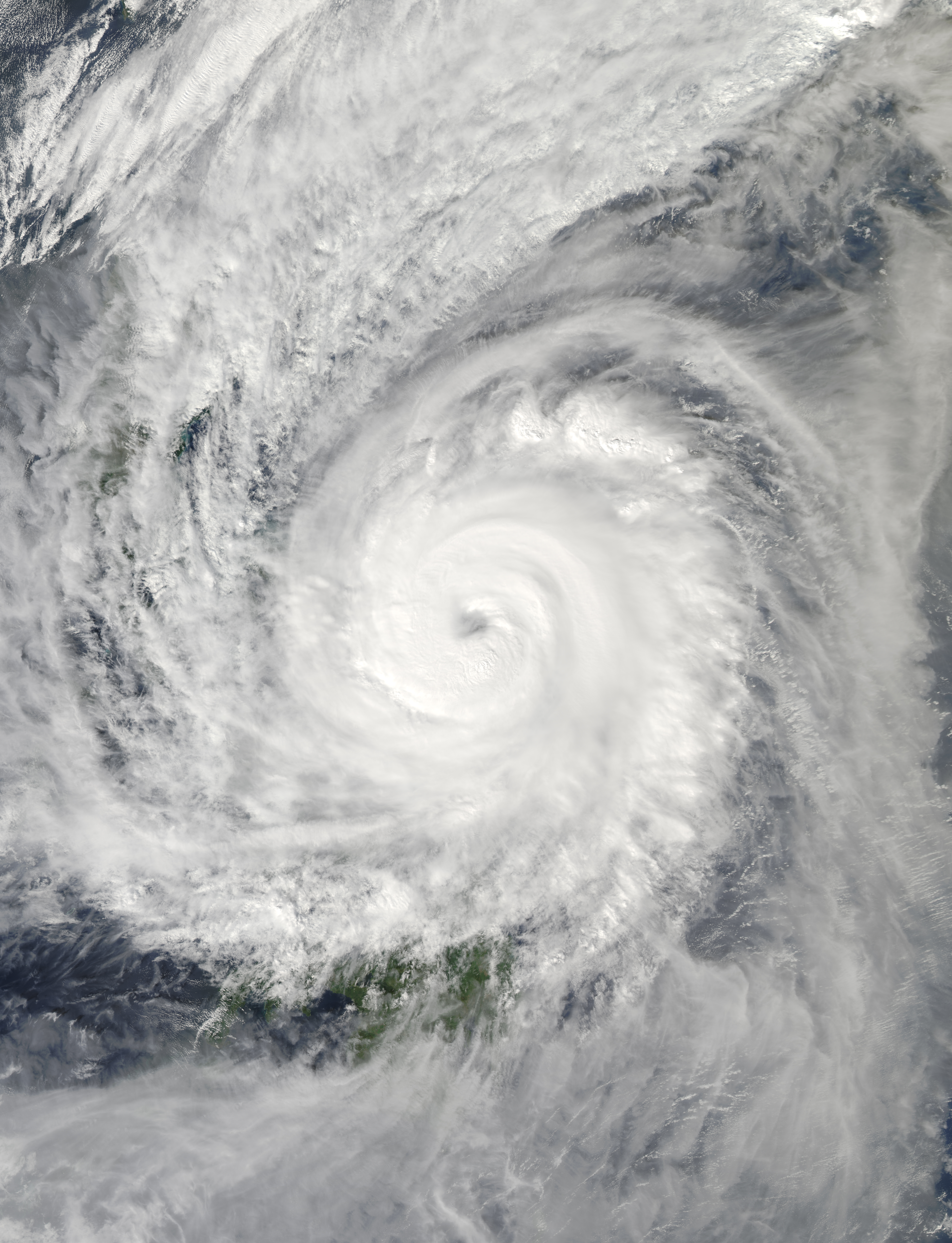
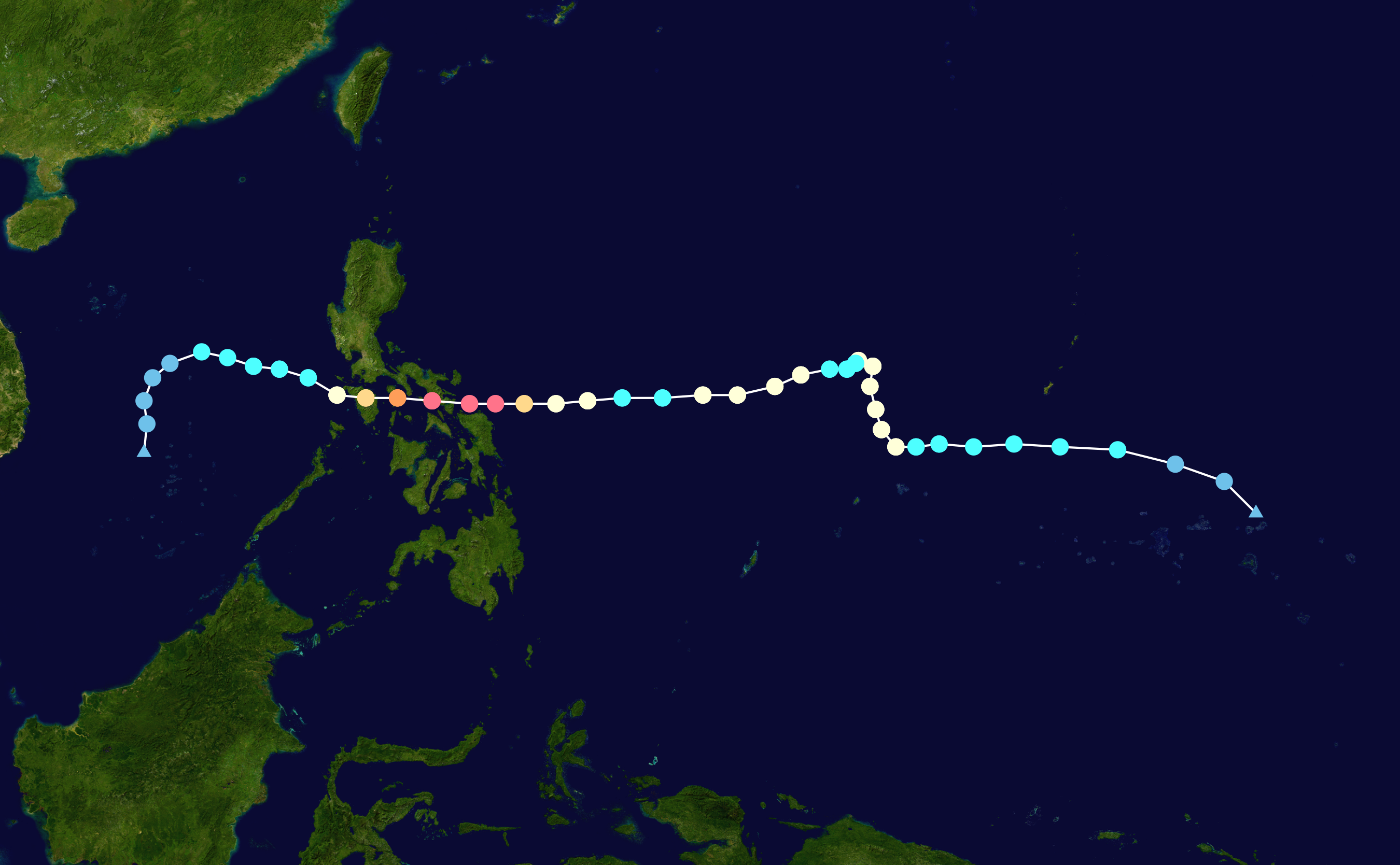
- Duration: November 24 – December 6
- Peak intensity: 165 km/h (105 mph) (10-min); 950 hPa (mbar)

On November 23, a low pressure system developed to the southeast of Guam. It then began to show signs of development and earned a defined circulation, developing into a tropical depression on 25 November, with the JTWC assigning it as 29W. The depression then began to develop banding features to the northeast of its center. The storm then intensified slightly, earning the name Kammuri, which is the Japanese word for the constellation Corona Borealis. Kammuri then passed south of Guam, and further intensified into a severe tropical storm on November 27, and then into a typhoon the next day. Upwelling of itself due to its quasi-stationary movement combined with moderate wind shear hindered significant intensification of Kammuri over the next three days as it moved into the Philippine Area of Responsibility, with PAGASA subsequently assigning the typhoon the name Tisoy. Kammuri began to show signs of rapid intensification again on December 1, ultimately intensifying to a Category 4 typhoon the next day. It made landfall at peak intensity on that day in the Bicol Region and began to weaken, weakening to a Category 3 typhoon that evening. On November 30, Kammuri produced possibly the record lowest known cloud top temperature at −109.4 °C (−164.9 °F).

As of January 22, 2020, 17 people have been found dead while 318 were injured. Estimated damages across the central Philippines have been at Php6.65 billion (US$130 million), according from the NDRRMC.

=== Typhoon Phanfone (Ursula) ===
- Typhoon (JMA)
- Category 3 typhoon (SSHWS)
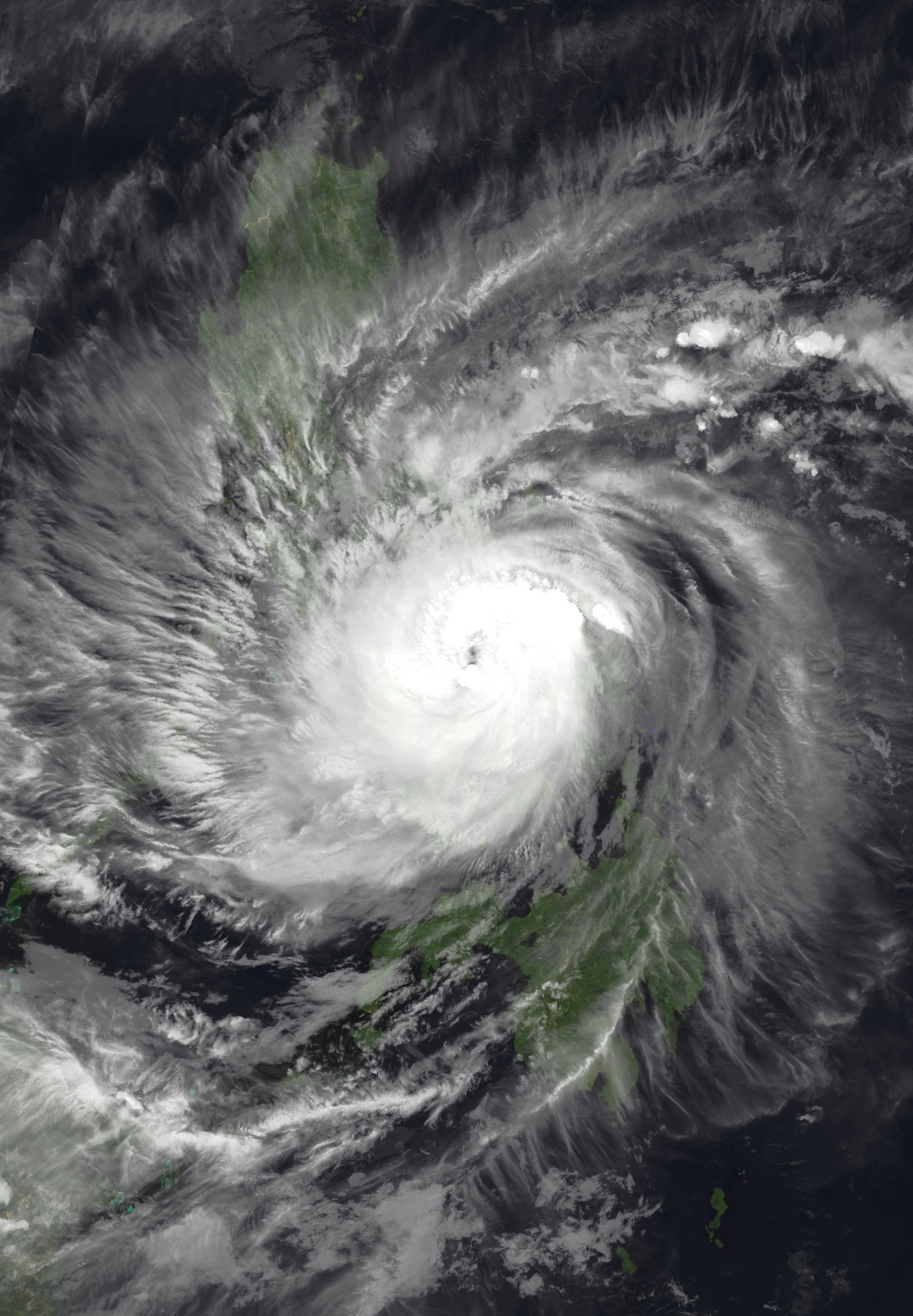
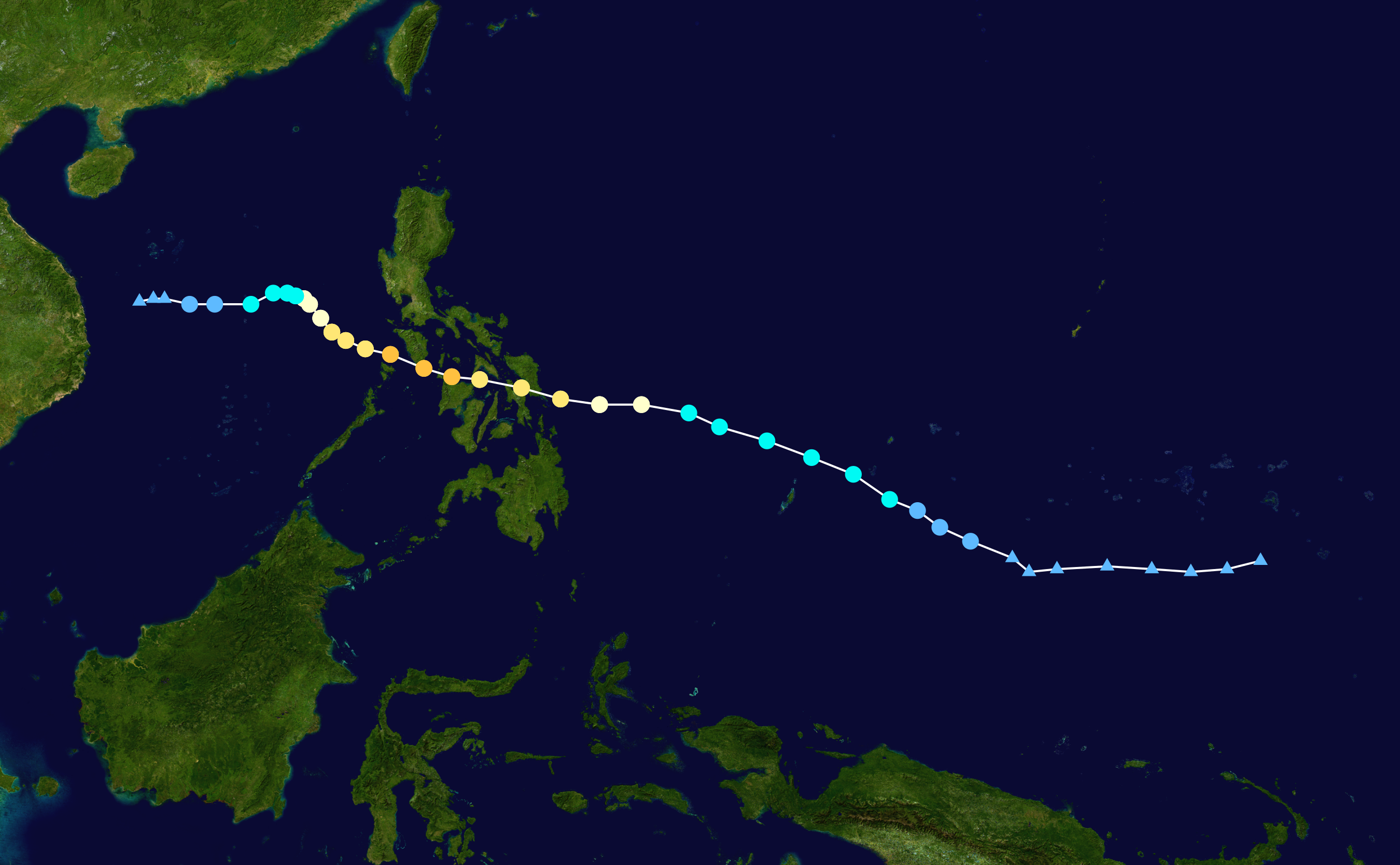
- Duration: December 19 – December 29
- Peak intensity: 150 km/h (90 mph) (10-min); 970 hPa (mbar)

On December 19, the Joint Typhoon Warning Center began monitoring a low pressure system to the southeast of Micronesia. The next day, the JTWC issued an orange alert in terms of its chance of development, and on the next day, they subsequently followed with a tropical cyclone formation alert. On that same day, as the formation alert was issued, the Japanese Meteorological Agency (JMA) issued its first advisory on the system as a tropical depression. It was given the identifier '30W' on late December 21. The JMA then upgraded the system to a tropical storm 6 hours later and issued the name Phanfone, but the JTWC still classified the system as a tropical depression. The system proceeded to move into the Philippine Area of Responsibility on December 23, 5:00 am PST, and was named Ursula by the PAGASA. On the same day, the JTWC finally upgraded the system to a tropical storm. Owing to favorable conditions, Phanfone intensified into a severe tropical storm on December 23, and further intensified into a Category 2 typhoon shortly before making landfall near Salcedo in Eastern Samar, causing drastic flooding and mudslides in the region weeks after Typhoon Kammuri. The total reported damages of the typhoon is at $67.2 million (or ₱3.44 billion) and the total fatalities is 50 deaths (with 55 missing).

=== Other systems ===
Many of the tropical depressions of the season failed to intensify into tropical storms, or even be numbered.

- On May 7, a tropical depression was located near Palau and remained stationary. It degenerated back into a remnant low the next day.
- Also, on May 7, another tropical depression developed near the Federal States of Micronesia and slowly moved westward over the next few days. It was last noted as tropical depression during May 15.
- On June 26, a tropical depression briefly formed in the East China Sea, near the Ryukyu Islands. Later that day, the storm was absorbed into the circulation of a nearby system which would eventually become Tropical Storm Sepat.

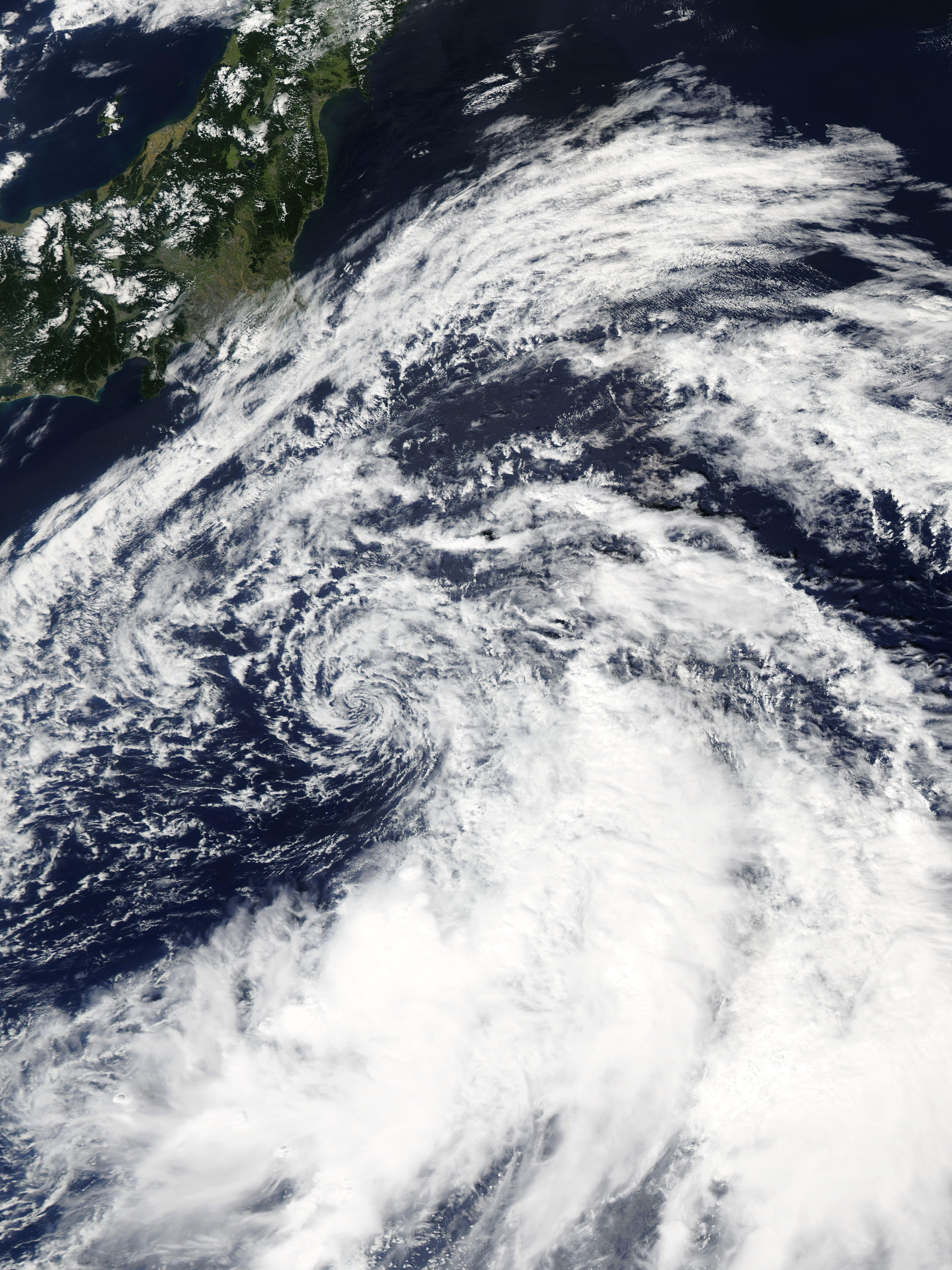
A tropical depression southeast of Japan on September 15

- On August 6, a tropical depression formed in the South China Sea, to the west of Luzon. On August 8, the tropical depression degenerated into a remnant low, and was absorbed by larger Typhoon Lekima to its east.
- 2 tropical depressions were monitored by JMA, to the Taiwan Strait and out in the North Pacific.
- On August 17, another depression formed and the JMA started monitoring it. However, a day later, it degenerated to a remnant low.
- A tropical depression formed to the southwest of Luzon on September 1. Slowly moving northwards, the system slowly intensified and was later designated as a TCFA by the JTWC. However by 18:00 UTC of September 2, the system rapidly deteriorated as it was getting absorbed by the outflow of the nearby Tropical Storm Kajiki.
- Another depression formed on September 4 but soon dissipated in the next day.
- On September 7, the JMA began monitoring on a weak tropical depression that had developed to the east of Taiwan. The JTWC upgraded this system to a subtropical depression. The system gradually intensified, however by September 10, the JMA downgraded the system a low-pressure area as it neared the Korean Peninsula.
- On September 15, another tropical depression briefly existed just to the south of Japan before it quickly transitioned into an extratropical cyclone, but not before interacting with the remnants of Marilyn, along with Tropical Storm Peipah, they pushed Marilyn back into the Philippine Area of Responsibility.
- Another tropical depression briefly existed on September 17 in the South China Sea, making landfall in east Luzon before being absorbed by the outflow of the developing Tropical Storm Tapah.
- On October 1, the JMA began to track a weak tropical depression that had developed in the Philippine Sea. The system moved westward while remaining very weak and disorganized until it was last noticed on October 3, to the northeast of Luzon.
- On October 22, a weak tropical depression briefly existed well north of the island of Palau.
- On November 29, a tropical depression formed on the Western part of the Philippines while Typhoon Kammuri lashed out on the country, but it dissipated 2 days later.

== Storm names ==
Within the Northwest Pacific Ocean, both the Japan Meteorological Agency (JMA) and the Philippine Atmospheric, Geophysical and Astronomical Services Administration (PAGASA) assign names to tropical cyclones that develop in the Western Pacific, which can result in a tropical cyclone having two names. The Japan Meteorological Agency's RSMC Tokyo — Typhoon Center assigns international names to tropical cyclones on behalf of the World Meteorological Organization's Typhoon Committee, should they be judged to have 10-minute sustained windspeeds of 65 km/h (40 mph). PAGASA names to tropical cyclones which move into or form as a tropical depression in their area of responsibility located between 135°E and 115°E and between 5°N and 25°N even if the cyclone has had an international name assigned to it. The names of significant tropical cyclones are retired, by both PAGASA and the Typhoon Committee. Should the list of names for the Philippine region be exhausted then names will be taken from an auxiliary list of which the first ten are published each season. Unused names are marked in gray.

=== International names ===
During the season 29 tropical storms developed in the Western Pacific and each one was named by the JMA, when the system was judged to have 10-minute sustained windspeeds of 65 km/h (40 mph). The JMA selected the names from a list of 140 names, that had been developed by the 14 members nations and territories of the ESCAP/WMO Typhoon Committee. During the season, the names Mun, Bailu, and Bualoi were used for the first time, after they replaced the names Fitow, Haiyan, and Rammasun which were retired after the 2013 and 2014 seasons, respectively.

| Pabuk | Wutip | Sepat | Mun | Danas | Nari | Wipha | Francisco | Lekima | Krosa | Bailu | Podul | Lingling | Kajiki | Faxai |
| Peipah | Tapah | Mitag | Hagibis | Neoguri | Bualoi | Matmo | Halong | Nakri | Fengshen | Kalmaegi | Fung-wong | Kammuri | Phanfone | |

==== Retirement ====
After the season, at their 52nd session in February 2020, the ESCAP/WMO Typhoon Committee announced that the names Lekima, Faxai, Hagibis, Kammuri, and Phanfone were removed from the naming lists due to the number of deaths and amount of damages each one caused in their respective onslaughts, and they will not be used again for another typhoon name. In 2021, they were replaced by Co-May, Nongfa, Ragasa, Koto, and Nokaen, respectively.

=== Philippines ===
| Amang | Betty | Chedeng | Dodong | Egay |
| Falcon | Goring | Hanna | Ineng | Jenny |
| Kabayan | Liwayway | Marilyn | Nimfa | Onyok |
| Perla | Quiel | Ramon | Sarah | Tisoy |
| Ursula | Viring (unused) | Weng (unused) | Yoyoy (unused) | Zigzag (unused) |
Auxiliary list
| Abe (unused) | Berto (unused) | Charo (unused) | Dado (unused) | Estoy (unused) |
| Felion (unused) | Gening (unused) | Herman (unused) | Irma (unused) | Jaime (unused) |

During the season PAGASA used its own naming scheme for the 21 tropical cyclones, that either developed within or moved into their self-defined area of responsibility. This was the same list used during the 2015 season and are scheduled to be used again during 2023. The names Liwayway and Nimfa, which replaced the names Lando and Nona were used for the first time this season, as well as Perla and Sarah after replacing Pedring and Sendong in 2011 but were not utilized in 2015.

==== Retirement ====
After the season, PAGASA had announced that the names Tisoy and Ursula would be removed from their naming lists after these typhoons caused a combined total of ₱11 billion damages both in Infrastructure and Agriculture on their respective onslaught in the country. In January 2020, the PAGASA chose the names Tamaraw and Ugong to replace Tisoy and Ursula for the 2023 season.

== Season effects ==
This table summarizes all the systems that developed within or moved into the North Pacific Ocean, to the west of the International Date Line during 2019. The tables also provide an overview of a systems intensity, duration, land areas affected and any deaths or damages associated with the system.

| Name | Dates | Peak intensity | | | Areas affected | Damage (USD) | Deaths | Ref(s). |
| Name | Dates | Category | Wind speed | Pressure | Areas affected | Damage (USD) | Deaths | Ref(s). |
|---|---|---|---|---|---|---|---|---|
| Pabuk | December 31, 2018 – January 4, 2019 | Tropical storm | 85 km/h (55 mph) | 996 hPa (29.4 inHg) | Natuna Islands, Vietnam, Malaysia, Thailand, Myanmar | $95.1 million | 10 | |
| 01W (Amang) | January 4 – 22 | Tropical depression | 55 km/h (35 mph) | 1,004 hPa (29.6 inHg) | Kiribati, Marshall Islands, Caroline Islands, Philippines | $580,000 | 10 | |
| Wutip (Betty) | February 18 – March 2 | Violent typhoon | 195 km/h (120 mph) | 920 hPa (27 inHg) | Caroline Islands, Mariana Islands | $3.3 million | None | |
| 03W (Chedeng) | March 14 – 19 | Tropical depression | Not specified | 1,006 hPa (29.7 inHg) | Caroline Islands, Philippines | $23,000 | None | |
| TD | May 7 – 8 | Tropical depression | Not specified | 1,004 hPa (29.6 inHg) | Yap, Palau | None | None | |
| TD | May 7 – 15 | Tropical depression | Not specified | 1,006 hPa (29.7 inHg) | Caroline Islands | None | None | |
| Sepat (Dodong) | June 24 – 28 | Tropical storm | 75 km/h (45 mph) | 994 hPa (29.4 inHg) | Japan, Aleutian Islands, Russian Far East | None | None | |
| TD | June 26 | Tropical depression | 55 km/h (35 mph) | 1,002 hPa (29.6 inHg) | Japan, Korean Peninsula | None | None | |
| 04W (Egay) | June 27 – July 1 | Tropical depression | Not specified | 1,002 hPa (29.6 inHg) | Yap, Philippines, Taiwan, East China | None | None | |
| Mun | July 1 – 4 | Tropical storm | 65 km/h (40 mph) | 992 hPa (29.3 inHg) | South China, Vietnam, Laos | $4.25 million | 2 | |
| Danas (Falcon) | July 14 – 21 | Tropical storm | 85 km/h (55 mph) | 985 hPa (29.1 inHg) | Yap, Philippines, Taiwan, East China, Japan, Korean Peninsula, Russian Far East | $6.42 million | 6 | |
| Goring | July 17 – 19 | Tropical depression | 55 km/h (35 mph) | 996 hPa (29.4 inHg) | Philippines, Taiwan, Ryukyu Islands | None | None | |
| Nari | July 24 – 27 | Tropical storm | 65 km/h (40 mph) | 998 hPa (29.5 inHg) | Japan | None | None | |
| Wipha | July 30 – August 4 | Tropical storm | 85 km/h (55 mph) | 985 hPa (29.1 inHg) | South China, Vietnam, Laos | $76.8 million | 27 | |
| Francisco | August 1 – 8 | Strong typhoon | 130 km/h (80 mph) | 970 hPa (29 inHg) | Japan, Korean Peninsula | Unknown | 1 | |
| Lekima (Hanna) | August 2 – 13 | Violent typhoon | 195 km/h (120 mph) | 925 hPa (27.3 inHg) | Caroline Islands, Philippines, Ryukyu Islands, Taiwan, South Korea, China | $9.28 billion | 105 | |
| Krosa | August 5 – 16 | Strong typhoon | 140 km/h (85 mph) | 965 hPa (28.5 inHg) | Mariana Islands, Japan, Korean Peninsula, Russian Far East | $20.5 million | 3 | |
| TD | August 6 – 8 | Tropical depression | 55 km/h (35 mph) | 994 hPa (29.4 inHg) | Philippines | None | None | |
| TD | August 17 – 18 | Tropical depression | Not specified | 1,006 hPa (29.7 inHg) | None | None | None | |
| TD | August 19 – 21 | Tropical depression | Not specified | 1,004 hPa (29.6 inHg) | Ryukyu Islands, Taiwan, East China | None | None | |
| Bailu (Ineng) | August 19 – 26 | Severe tropical storm | 95 km/h (60 mph) | 985 hPa (29.1 inHg) | Philippines, Taiwan, South China | $28.2 million | 3 | |
| Podul (Jenny) | August 24 – 31 | Tropical storm | 75 km/h (45 mph) | 992 hPa (29.3 inHg) | Yap, Philippines, Vietnam, Laos, Thailand, Cambodia | $19.2 million | 14 | |
| Kajiki (Kabayan) | August 30 – September 6 | Tropical storm | 65 km/h (40 mph) | 996 hPa (29.4 inHg) | Philippines, South China, Vietnam, Laos | $76.2 million | 10 | |
| Lingling (Liwayway) | August 31 – September 7 | Very strong typhoon | 175 km/h (110 mph) | 940 hPa (28 inHg) | Philippines, Ryukyu Islands, Korean Peninsula, Northeast China, Russian Far East | $300 million | 8 | |
| TD | September 1 – 2 | Tropical depression | 55 km/h (35 mph) | 1,000 hPa (30 inHg) | Philippines | None | None | |
| Faxai | September 2 – 9 | Very strong typhoon | 155 km/h (95 mph) | 955 hPa (28.2 inHg) | Japan | $10 billion | 3 | |
| TD | September 4 – 5 | Tropical depression | Not specified | 1,006 hPa (29.7 inHg) | Caroline Islands | None | None | |
| TD | September 7 – 10 | Tropical depression | 55 km/h (35 mph) | 1,000 hPa (30 inHg) | Ryukyu Islands, Korean Peninsula | None | None | |
| Marilyn | September 10 – 13 | Tropical depression | 55 km/h (35 mph) | 996 hPa (29.4 inHg) | None | None | None | |
| Peipah | September 12 – 16 | Tropical storm | 65 km/h (40 mph) | 1,000 hPa (30 inHg) | Mariana Islands, Bonin Islands | None | None | |
| TD | September 15 | Tropical depression | Not specified | 996 hPa (29.4 inHg) | Japan | None | None | |
| Tapah (Nimfa) | September 17 – 22 | Strong typhoon | 120 km/h (75 mph) | 970 hPa (29 inHg) | Taiwan, East China, Japan, South Korea | $7.9 million | 3 | |
| TD | September 17 | Tropical depression | Not specified | 1,004 hPa (29.6 inHg) | Philippines | None | None | |
| Mitag (Onyok) | September 24 – October 3 | Strong typhoon | 140 km/h (85 mph) | 965 hPa (28.5 inHg) | Mariana Islands, Taiwan, Japan, East China, South Korea | >$816 million | 22 | |
| TD | October 1 – 3 | Tropical depression | Not specified | 1,008 hPa (29.8 inHg) | None | None | None | |
| Hagibis | October 4 – 13 | Violent typhoon | 195 km/h (120 mph) | 915 hPa (27.0 inHg) | Mariana Islands, Japan, South Korea, Russian Far East, Aleutian Islands, Alaska | >$17.3 billion | 121 | |
| Neoguri (Perla) | October 15 – 21 | Strong typhoon | 140 km/h (85 mph) | 970 hPa (29 inHg) | Japan | None | None | |
| Bualoi | October 18 – 25 | Very strong typhoon | 185 km/h (115 mph) | 935 hPa (27.6 inHg) | Caroline Islands, Mariana Islands | $200 million | 13 | |
| TD | October 21 – 22 | Tropical depression | Not specified | 1,008 hPa (29.8 inHg) | None | None | None | |
| Matmo | October 28 – 31 | Severe tropical storm | 95 km/h (60 mph) | 992 hPa (29.3 inHg) | Philippines, Vietnam, Cambodia, Laos, Thailand | $39.4 million | 2 | |
| Halong | November 1 – 8 | Violent typhoon | 215 km/h (130 mph) | 905 hPa (26.7 inHg) | None | None | None | |
| Nakri (Quiel) | November 4 – 11 | Strong typhoon | 120 km/h (75 mph) | 975 hPa (28.8 inHg) | Philippines, Vietnam | $49.4 million | 24 | |
| Fengshen | November 9 – 17 | Very strong typhoon | 155 km/h (95 mph) | 965 hPa (28.5 inHg) | Marshall Islands, Marianas Islands | None | None | |
| Kalmaegi (Ramon) | November 9 – 22 | Strong typhoon | 130 km/h (80 mph) | 975 hPa (28.8 inHg) | Philippines, Taiwan | $12.4 million | None | |
| Fung-wong (Sarah) | November 17 – 23 | Severe tropical storm | 100 km/h (60 mph) | 990 hPa (29 inHg) | Philippines, Taiwan, Ryukyu Islands | None | None | |
| Kammuri (Tisoy) | November 24 – December 6 | Very strong typhoon | 165 km/h (105 mph) | 950 hPa (28 inHg) | Caroline Islands, Mariana Islands, Philippines | $130 million | 17 | |
| TD | November 26 – 28 | Tropical depression | 55 km/h (35 mph) | 1,002 hPa (29.6 inHg) | Mariana Islands | None | None | |
| TD | November 28 – December 1 | Tropical depression | 55 km/h (35 mph) | 1,002 hPa (29.6 inHg) | Caroline Islands | None | None | |
| Phanfone (Ursula) | December 19 – 29 | Strong typhoon | 150 km/h (95 mph) | 970 hPa (29 inHg) | Caroline Islands, Philippines | $67.2 million | 50 | |
Season aggregates
| 50 systems | December 31, 2018 – December 29, 2019 | | 215 km/h (130 mph) | 905 hPa (26.7 inHg) | | $38.5 billion | 453 | |

== See also ==
- Weather of 2019
- Tropical cyclones in 2019
- Pacific typhoon season
- 2019 Atlantic hurricane season
- 2019 Pacific hurricane season
- 2019 North Indian Ocean cyclone season
- South-West Indian Ocean cyclone seasons: 2018–19, 2019–20
- Australian region cyclone seasons: 2018–19, 2019–20
- South Pacific cyclone seasons: 2018–19, 2019–20
